The history of Africa begins with the emergence of hominids, archaic humans and — around 300,000–250,000 years ago — anatomically modern humans (Homo sapiens), in East Africa, and continues unbroken into the present as a patchwork of diverse and politically developing nation states. The earliest known recorded history arose in Ancient Egypt, and later in Nubia, the Sahel, the Maghreb, and the Horn of Africa.

Following the desertification of the Sahara, North African history became entwined with the Middle East and Southern Europe while the Bantu expansion swept from modern day Cameroon (Central Africa) across much of the sub-Saharan continent in waves between around 1000 BC and 1 AD, creating a linguistic commonality across much of the central and Southern continent.

During the Middle Ages, Islam spread west from Arabia to Egypt, crossing the Maghreb and the Sahel. Some notable pre-colonial states and societies in Africa include the Ajuran Empire, Bachwezi Empire, D'mt, Adal Sultanate, Alodia, Dagbon Kingdom , Warsangali Sultanate, Buganda Kingdom, Kingdom of Nri, Nok culture, Mali Empire, Bono State, Songhai Empire, Benin Empire, Oyo Empire, Kingdom of Lunda (Punu-yaka), Ashanti Empire, Ghana Empire, Mossi Kingdoms, Mutapa Empire, Kingdom of Mapungubwe, Kingdom of Sine, Kingdom of Sennar, Kingdom of Saloum, Kingdom of Baol, Kingdom of Cayor, Kingdom of Zimbabwe, Kingdom of Kongo, Empire of Kaabu, Kingdom of Ile Ife, Ancient Carthage, Numidia, Mauretania, and the Aksumite Empire. At its peak, prior to European colonialism, it is estimated that Africa had up to 10,000 different states and autonomous groups with distinct languages and customs.

From the late 15th century, Europeans joined the slave trade. That includes the triangular trade, with the Portuguese initially acquiring slaves through trade and later by force as part of the Atlantic slave trade. They transported enslaved West, Central, and Southern Africans overseas. Subsequently, European colonization of Africa developed rapidly from around 10% (1870) to over 90% (1914) in the Scramble for Africa (1881–1914). However following struggles for independence in many parts of the continent, as well as a weakened Europe after the Second World War , decolonization took place across the continent, culminating in the 1960 Year of Africa.

Disciplines such as recording of oral history, historical linguistics, archaeology, and genetics have been vital in rediscovering the great African civilizations of antiquity.

Prehistory

Paleolithic

Lower Paleolithic

The first known hominids evolved in Africa. According to paleontology, the early hominids' skull anatomy was similar to that of the gorilla and the chimpanzee, great apes that also evolved in Africa, but the hominids had adopted a bipedal locomotion which freed their hands. This gave them a crucial advantage, enabling them to live in both forested areas and on the open savanna at a time when Africa was drying up and the savanna was encroaching on forested areas. This would have occurred 10 to 5 million years ago, but these claims are controversial because biologists and genetics have humans appearing around the last 70 thousand to 200 thousand years.

By 4 million years ago, several australopithecine hominid species had developed throughout Southern, Eastern and Central Africa. They were tool users, and makers of tools. They scavenged for meat and were omnivores.

By approximately 3.3 million years ago, primitive stone tools were first used to scavenge kills made by other predators and to harvest carrion and marrow from their bones. In hunting, Homo habilis was probably not capable of competing with large predators and was still more prey than hunter. H. habilis probably did steal eggs from nests and may have been able to catch small game and weakened larger prey (cubs and older animals). The tools were classed as Oldowan.

Around 1.8 million years ago, Homo ergaster first appeared in the fossil record in Africa. From Homo ergaster, Homo erectus evolved 1.5 million years ago. Some of the earlier representatives of this species were still fairly small-brained and used primitive stone tools, much like H. habilis. The brain later grew in size, and H. erectus eventually developed a more complex stone tool technology called the Acheulean. Possibly the first hunters, H. erectus mastered the art of making fire and was the first hominid to leave Africa, colonizing most of Afro-Eurasia and perhaps later giving rise to Homo floresiensis. Although some recent writers have suggested that Homo georgicus was the first and primary hominid ever to live outside Africa, many scientists consider H. georgicus to be an early and primitive member of the H. erectus species.

Middle Paleolithic

The fossil record shows Homo sapiens (also known as "modern humans" or "anatomically modern humans") living in Africa by about 350,000-260,000 years ago. The earliest known Homo sapiens fossils include the Jebel Irhoud remains from Morocco, the Florisbad Skull from South Africa, and the Omo remains from Ethiopia. Scientists have suggested that Homo sapiens may have arisen between 350,000 and 260,000 years ago through a merging of populations in East Africa and South Africa.

Evidence of a variety of behaviors indicative of Behavioral modernity date to the African Middle Stone Age, associated with early Homo sapiens and their emergence. Abstract imagery, widened subsistence strategies, and other "modern" behaviors have been discovered from that period in Africa, especially South, North, and East Africa. The Blombos Cave site in South Africa, for example, is famous for rectangular slabs of ochre engraved with geometric designs. Using multiple dating techniques, the site was confirmed to be around 77,000 and 100–75,000 years old. Ostrich egg shell containers engraved with geometric designs dating to 60,000 years ago were found at Diepkloof, South Africa. Beads and other personal ornamentation have been found from Morocco which might be as much as 130,000 years old; as well, the Cave of Hearths in South Africa has yielded a number of beads dating from significantly prior to 50,000 years ago, and shell beads dating to about 75,000 years ago have been found at Blombos Cave, South Africa.

Specialized projectile weapons as well have been found at various sites in Middle Stone Age Africa, including bone and stone arrowheads at South African sites such as Sibudu Cave (along with an early bone needle also found at Sibudu) dating approximately 60,000-70,000 years ago, and bone harpoons at the Central African site of Katanda dating to about 90,000 years ago. Evidence also exists for the systematic heat treating of silcrete stone to increase its flake-ability for the purpose of toolmaking, beginning approximately 164,000 years ago at the South African site of Pinnacle Point and becoming common there for the creation of microlithic tools at about 72,000 years ago. Early stone-tipped projectile weapons (a characteristic tool of Homo sapiens), the stone tips of javelins or throwing spears, were discovered in 2013 at the Ethiopian site of Gademotta, and date to around 279,000 years ago.

In 2008, an ochre processing workshop likely for the production of paints was uncovered dating to ca. 100,000 years ago at Blombos Cave, South Africa. Analysis shows that a liquefied pigment-rich mixture was produced and stored in the two abalone shells, and that ochre, bone, charcoal, grindstones and hammer-stones also formed a composite part of the toolkits. Evidence for the complexity of the task includes procuring and combining raw materials from various sources (implying they had a mental template of the process they would follow), possibly using pyrotechnology to facilitate fat extraction from bone, using a probable recipe to produce the compound, and the use of shell containers for mixing and storage for later use.
Modern behaviors, such as the making of shell beads, bone tools and arrows, and the use of ochre pigment, are evident at a Kenyan site by 78,000-67,000 years ago.

Expanding subsistence strategies beyond big-game hunting and the consequential diversity in tool types has been noted as signs of behavioral modernity. A number of South African sites have shown an early reliance on aquatic resources from fish to shellfish. Pinnacle Point, in particular, shows exploitation of marine resources as early as 120,000 years ago, perhaps in response to more arid conditions inland. Establishing a reliance on predictable shellfish deposits, for example, could reduce mobility and facilitate complex social systems and symbolic behavior. Blombos Cave and Site 440 in Sudan both show evidence of fishing as well. Taphonomic change in fish skeletons from Blombos Cave have been interpreted as capture of live fish, clearly an intentional human behavior. Humans in North Africa (Nazlet Sabaha, Egypt) are known to have dabbled in chert mining, as early as ≈100,000 years ago, for the construction of stone tools.

Evidence was found in 2018, dating to about 320,000 years ago, at the Kenyan site of Olorgesailie, of the early emergence of modern behaviors including: long-distance trade networks (involving goods such as obsidian), the use of pigments, and the possible making of projectile points. It is observed by the authors of three 2018 studies on the site, that the evidence of these behaviors is approximately contemporary to the earliest known Homo sapiens fossil remains from Africa (such as at Jebel Irhoud and Florisbad), and they suggest that complex and modern behaviors began in Africa around the time of the emergence of Homo sapiens. In 2019, further evidence of early complex projectile weapons in Africa was found at Adouma, Ethiopia dated 80,000-100,000 years ago, in the form of points considered likely to belong to darts delivered by spear throwers.

Upper Paleolithic

Around 65–50,000 years ago, the species' expansion out of Africa launched the colonization of the planet by modern human beings. By 10,000 BC, Homo sapiens had spread to most corners of Afro-Eurasia. Their dispersals are traced by linguistic, cultural and genetic evidence. Eurasian back-migrations, specifically West-Eurasian backflow, started in the early Holocene or already earlier in the Paleolithic period, sometimes between 30-15,000 years ago, followed by pre-Neolithic and Neolithic migration waves from the Middle East, mostly affecting Northern Africa, the Horn of Africa, and wider regions of the Sahel zone and East Africa.

The earliest physical evidence of astronomical activity may be a lunar calendar found on the Ishango bone dated to between 23,000 and 18,000 BC from in what is now the Democratic Republic of the Congo. However, this interpretation of the object's purpose is disputed.

Scholars have argued that warfare was absent throughout much of humanity's prehistoric past, and that it emerged from more complex political systems as a result of sedentism, agricultural farming, etc. However, the findings at the site of Nataruk in Turkana County, Kenya, where the remains of 27 individuals who died as the result of an intentional attack by another group 10,000 years ago, suggest that inter-human conflict has a much longer history.

Emergence of agriculture and desertification of the Sahara

Around 16,000 BC, from the Red Sea Hills to the northern Ethiopian Highlands, nuts, grasses and tubers were being collected for food. By 13,000 to 11,000 BC, people began collecting wild grains. This spread to Western Asia, which domesticated its wild grains, wheat and barley. Between 10,000 and 8000 BC, Northeast Africa was cultivating wheat and barley and raising sheep and cattle from Southwest Asia. A wet climatic phase in Africa turned the Ethiopian Highlands into a mountain forest. Omotic speakers domesticated enset around 6500–5500 BC. Around 7000 BC, the settlers of the Ethiopian highlands domesticated donkeys, and by 4000 BC domesticated donkeys had spread to Southwest Asia. Cushitic speakers, partially turning away from cattle herding, domesticated teff and finger millet between 5500 and 3500 BC.

During the 11th millennium BP, pottery was independently invented in Africa, with the earliest pottery there dating to about 9,400 BC from central Mali. It soon spread throughout the southern Sahara and Sahel. In the steppes and savannahs of the Sahara and Sahel in Northern West Africa, the Nilo-Saharan speakers and Mandé peoples started to collect and domesticate wild millet, African rice and sorghum between 8000 and 6000 BC. Later, gourds, watermelons, castor beans, and cotton were also collected and domesticated. The people started capturing wild cattle and holding them in circular thorn hedges, resulting in domestication. They also started making pottery and built stone settlements (e.g., Tichitt, Oualata). Fishing, using bone-tipped harpoons, became a major activity in the numerous streams and lakes formed from the increased rains. Mande peoples have been credited with the independent development of agriculture about 4000–3000 BC.

In West Africa, the wet phase ushered in an expanding rainforest and wooded savanna from Senegal to Cameroon. Between 9000 and 5000 BC, Niger–Congo speakers domesticated the oil palm and raffia palm. Two seed plants, black-eyed peas and voandzeia (African groundnuts), were domesticated, followed by okra and kola nuts. Since most of the plants grew in the forest, the Niger–Congo speakers invented polished stone axes for clearing forest.

Most of Southern Africa was occupied by pygmy peoples and Khoisan who engaged in hunting and gathering. Some of the oldest rock art was produced by them.

For several hundred thousand years the Sahara has alternated between desert and savanna grassland in a 41,000 year cycle caused by changes ("precession") in the Earth's axis as it rotates around the sun which change the location of the North African Monsoon. When the North African monsoon is at its strongest annual precipitation and subsequent vegetation in the Sahara region increase, resulting in conditions commonly referred to as the "green Sahara". For a relatively weak North African monsoon, the opposite is true, with decreased annual precipitation and less vegetation resulting in a phase of the Sahara climate cycle known as the "desert Sahara". The Sahara has been a desert for several thousand years, and is expected to become green again in about 15,000 years time (17,000 AD).

Just prior to Saharan desertification, the communities that developed south of Egypt, in what is now Sudan, were full participants in the Neolithic revolution and lived a settled to semi-nomadic lifestyle, with domesticated plants and animals. It has been suggested that megaliths found at Nabta Playa are examples of the world's first known archaeoastronomical devices, predating Stonehenge by some 1,000 years. The sociocultural complexity observed at Nabta Playa and expressed by different levels of authority within the society there has been suggested as forming the basis for the structure of both the Neolithic society at Nabta and the Old Kingdom of Egypt. By 5000 BC, Africa entered a dry phase, and the climate of the Sahara region gradually became drier. The population trekked out of the Sahara region in all directions, including towards the Nile Valley below the Second Cataract, where they made permanent or semipermanent settlements. A major climatic recession occurred, lessening the heavy and persistent rains in Central and Eastern Africa.

Central Africa

There are archaeological findings in Central Africa dating back to over 100,000 years.

These findings indicate that the early civilizations of Sao, Kanem, Bornu, Shilluk, Baguirmi, and Wadai., were brought into fruition and sustained due to sophisticated advancements in their societies' agricultural techniques as well as trade.

Around 1,000 BC, Bantu reached the Great Lakes Region in Central Africa. Halfway through the first millennium BC, the Bantu settled as far south as what today is known as Angola.

Metallurgy

Evidence of the early smelting of metals lead, copper, and bronze dates from the fourth millennium BC.

Egyptians smelted copper during the predynastic period, and bronze came into use after 3,000 BC at the latest in Egypt and Nubia. Nubia became a major source of copper as well as of gold. The use of gold and silver in Egypt dates back to the predynastic period.

In the Aïr Mountains of present-day Niger people smelted copper independently of developments in the Nile valley between 3,000 and 2,500 BC. They used a process unique to the region, suggesting that the technology was not brought in from outside; it became more mature by about 1,500 BC.

By the 1st millennium BC iron working had reached Northwestern Africa, Egypt, and Nubia. Zangato and Holl document evidence of iron-smelting in the Central African Republic and Cameroon that may date back to 3,000 to 2,500 BC. Assyrians using iron weapons pushed Nubians out of Egypt in 670 BC, after which the use of iron became widespread in the Nile valley.

The theory that iron spread to Sub-Saharan Africa via the Nubian city of Meroe is no longer widely accepted, and some researchers believe that sub-Saharan Africans invented iron metallurgy independently. Metalworking in West Africa has been dated as early as 2,500 BC at Egaro west of the Termit in Niger, and iron working was practiced there by 1,500 BC. Iron smelting has been dated to 2,000 BC in southeast Nigeria. Central Africa provides possible evidence of iron working as early as the 3rd millennium BC. Iron smelting developed in the area between Lake Chad and the African Great Lakes between 1,000 and 600 BC, and in West Africa around 2,000 BC, long before the technology reached Egypt. Before 500 BC, the Nok culture in the Jos Plateau was already smelting iron. Archaeological sites containing iron-smelting furnaces and slag have been excavated at sites in the Nsukka region of southeast Nigeria in Igboland: dating to 2,000 BC at the site of Lejja (Eze-Uzomaka 2009) and to 750 BC and at the site of Opi (Holl 2009). The site of Gbabiri (in the Central African Republic) has also yielded evidence of iron metallurgy, from a reduction furnace and blacksmith workshop; with earliest dates of 896-773 BC and 907-796 BC respectively.

Antiquity

The ancient history of North Africa is inextricably linked to that of the Ancient Near East. This is particularly true of Ancient Egypt and Nubia. In the Horn of Africa the Kingdom of Aksum ruled modern-day Eritrea, northern Ethiopia and the coastal area of the western part of the Arabian Peninsula. The Ancient Egyptians established ties with the Land of Punt in 2,350 BC. Punt was a trade partner of Ancient Egypt and it is believed that it was located in modern-day Somalia, Djibouti or Eritrea. Phoenician cities such as Carthage were part of the Mediterranean Iron Age and classical antiquity. Sub-Saharan Africa developed more or less independently in those times.

Ancient Egypt

After the desertification of the Sahara, settlement became concentrated in the Nile Valley, where numerous sacral chiefdoms appeared. The regions with the largest population pressure were in the Nile Delta region of Lower Egypt, in Upper Egypt, and also along the second and third cataracts of the Dongola Reach of the Nile in Nubia. This population pressure and growth was brought about by the cultivation of southwest Asian crops, including wheat and barley, and the raising of sheep, goats, and cattle. Population growth led to competition for farm land and the need to regulate farming. Regulation was established by the formation of bureaucracies among sacral chiefdoms. The first and most powerful of the chiefdoms was Ta-Seti, founded around 3,500 BC. The idea of sacral chiefdom spread throughout Upper and Lower Egypt.

Later consolidation of the chiefdoms into broader political entities began to occur in Upper and Lower Egypt, culminating into the unification of Egypt into one political entity by Narmer (Menes) in 3,100 BC. Instead of being viewed as a sacral chief, he became a divine king. The henotheism, or worship of a single god within a polytheistic system, practiced in the sacral chiefdoms along Upper and Lower Egypt, became the polytheistic Ancient Egyptian religion. Bureaucracies became more centralized under the pharaohs, run by viziers, governors, tax collectors, generals, artists, and technicians. They engaged in tax collecting, organizing of labor for major public works, and building irrigation systems, pyramids, temples, and canals. During the Fourth Dynasty (2,620–2,480 BC), long-distance trade was developed, with the Levant for timber, with Nubia for gold and skins, with Punt for frankincense, and also with the western Libyan territories. For most of the Old Kingdom, Egypt developed her fundamental systems, institutions and culture, always through the central bureaucracy and by the divinity of the Pharaoh.

After the fourth millennium BC, Egypt started to extend direct military and political control over her southern and western neighbors. By 2,200 BC, the Old Kingdom's stability was undermined by rivalry among the governors of the nomes who challenged the power of pharaohs and by invasions of Asiatics into the Nile Delta. The First Intermediate Period had begun, a time of political division and uncertainty.

Middle Kingdom of Egypt arose when Mentuhotep II of Eleventh Dynasty unified Egypt once again between 2041 and 2016 BC beginning with his conquering of Tenth Dynasty in 2041 BC. Pyramid building resumed, long-distance trade re-emerged, and the center of power moved from Memphis to Thebes. Connections with the southern regions of Kush, Wawat and Irthet at the second cataract were made stronger. Then came the Second Intermediate Period, with the invasion of the Hyksos on horse-drawn chariots and utilizing bronze weapons, a technology heretofore unseen in Egypt. Horse-drawn chariots soon spread to the west in the inhabitable Sahara and North Africa. The Hyksos failed to hold on to their Egyptian territories and were absorbed by Egyptian society. This eventually led to one of Egypt's most powerful phases, the New Kingdom (1,580–1,080 BC), with the Eighteenth Dynasty. Egypt became a superpower controlling Nubia and Judea while exerting political influence on the Libyans to the West and on the Mediterranean.

As before, the New Kingdom ended with invasion from the west by Libyan princes, leading to the Third Intermediate Period. Beginning with Shoshenq I, the Twenty-second Dynasty was established. It ruled for two centuries.

To the south, Nubian independence and strength was being reasserted. This reassertion led to the conquest of Egypt by Nubia, begun by Kashta and completed by Piye (Pianhky, 751–730 BC) and Shabaka (716–695 BC). This was the birth of the Twenty-fifth Dynasty of Egypt. The Nubians tried to re-establish Egyptian traditions and customs. They ruled Egypt for a hundred years. This was ended by an Assyrian invasion, with Taharqa experiencing the full might of Assyrian iron weapons. The Nubian pharaoh Tantamani was the last of the Twenty-fifth dynasty.

When the Assyrians and Nubians left, a new Twenty-sixth Dynasty emerged from Sais. It lasted until 525 BC, when Egypt was invaded by the Persians. Unlike the Assyrians, the Persians stayed. In 332, Egypt was conquered by Alexander the Great. This was the beginning of the Ptolemaic dynasty, which ended with Roman conquest in 30 BC. Pharaonic Egypt had come to an end.

Nubia

Around 3,500 BC, one of the first sacral kingdoms to arise in the Nile was Ta-Seti, located in northern Nubia. Ta-Seti was a powerful sacral kingdom in the Nile Valley at the 1st and 2nd cataracts that exerted an influence over nearby chiefdoms based on pictorial representation ruling over Upper Egypt. Ta-Seti traded as far as Syro-Palestine, as well as with Egypt. Ta-Seti exported gold, copper, ostrich feathers, ebony and ivory to the Old Kingdom. By the 32nd century BC, Ta-Seti was in decline. After the unification of Egypt by Narmer in 3,100 BC, Ta-Seti was invaded by the Pharaoh Hor-Aha of the First Dynasty, destroying the final remnants of the kingdom. Ta-Seti is affiliated with the A-Group Culture known to archaeology.

Small sacral kingdoms continued to dot the Nubian portion of the Nile for centuries after 3,000 BC. Around the latter part of the third millennium, there was further consolidation of the sacral kingdoms. Two kingdoms in particular emerged: the Sai kingdom, immediately south of Egypt, and the Kingdom of Kerma at the third cataract. Sometime around the 18th century BC, the Kingdom of Kerma conquered the Kingdom of Sai, becoming a serious rival to Egypt. Kerma occupied a territory from the first cataract to the confluence of the Blue Nile, White Nile, and Atbarah River. About 1,575 to 1,550 BC, during the latter part of the Seventeenth Dynasty, the Kingdom of Kerma invaded Egypt. The Kingdom of Kerma allied itself with the Hyksos invasion of Egypt.

Egypt eventually re-energized under the Eighteenth Dynasty and conquered the Kingdom of Kerma or Kush, ruling it for almost 500 years. The Kushites were Egyptianized during this period. By 1100 BC, the Egyptians had withdrawn from Kush. The region regained independence and reasserted its culture. Kush built a new religion around Amun and made Napata its spiritual center. In 730 BC, the Kingdom of Kush invaded Egypt, taking over Thebes and beginning the Nubian Empire. The empire extended from Palestine to the confluence of the Blue Nile, the White Nile, and River Atbara.

In 664 BC, the Kushites were expelled from Egypt by iron-wielding Assyrians. Later, the administrative capital was moved from Napata to Meröe, developing a new Nubian culture. Initially, Meroites were highly Egyptianized, but they subsequently began to take on distinctive features. Nubia became a center of iron-making and cotton cloth manufacturing. Egyptian writing was replaced by the Meroitic alphabet. The lion god Apedemak was added to the Egyptian pantheon of gods. Trade links to the Red Sea increased, linking Nubia with Mediterranean Greece. Its architecture and art diversified, with pictures of lions, ostriches, giraffes, and elephants. Eventually, with the rise of Aksum, Nubia's trade links were broken and it suffered environmental degradation from the tree cutting required for iron production. In 350 AD, the Aksumite king Ezana brought Meröe to an end.

Carthage

The Egyptians referred to the people west of the Nile, ancestral to the Berbers, as Libyans. The Libyans were agriculturalists like the Mauri of Morocco and the Numidians of central and eastern Algeria and Tunis. They were also nomadic, having the horse, and occupied the arid pastures and desert, like the Gaetuli. Berber desert nomads were typically in conflict with Berber coastal agriculturalists.

The Phoenicians were Mediterranean seamen in constant search for valuable metals such as copper, gold, tin, and lead. They began to populate the North African coast with settlements—trading and mixing with the native Berber population. In 814 BC, Phoenicians from Tyre established the city of Carthage. By 600 BC, Carthage had become a major trading entity and power in the Mediterranean, largely through trade with tropical Africa. Carthage's prosperity fostered the growth of the Berber kingdoms, Numidia and Mauretania. Around 500 BC, Carthage provided a strong impetus for trade with Sub-Saharan Africa. Berber middlemen, who had maintained contacts with Sub-Saharan Africa since the desert had desiccated, used pack animals to transfer products from oasis to oasis. Danger lurked from the Garamantes of Fez, who raided caravans. Salt and metal goods were traded for gold, slaves, beads, and ivory.

The Carthaginians were rivals to the Greeks and Romans. Carthage fought the Punic Wars, three wars with Rome: the First Punic War (264 to 241 BC), over Sicily; the Second Punic War (218 to 201 BC), in which Hannibal invaded Europe; and the Third Punic War (149 to 146 BC). Carthage lost the first two wars, and in the third it was destroyed, becoming the Roman province of Africa, with the Berber Kingdom of Numidia assisting Rome. The Roman province of Africa became a major agricultural supplier of wheat, olives, and olive oil to imperial Rome via exorbitant taxation. Two centuries later, Rome brought the Berber kingdoms of Numidia and Mauretania under its authority. In the 420's AD, Vandals invaded North Africa and Rome lost her territories, subsequently the Berber kingdoms regained their independence.

Christianity gained a foothold in Africa at Alexandria in the 1st century AD and spread to Northwest Africa. By 313 AD, with the Edict of Milan, all of Roman North Africa was Christian. Egyptians adopted Monophysite Christianity and formed the independent Coptic Church. Berbers adopted Donatist Christianity. Both groups refused to accept the authority of the Roman Catholic Church.

Role of the Berbers

As Carthaginian power grew, its impact on the indigenous population increased dramatically. Berber civilization was already at a stage in which agriculture, manufacturing, trade, and political organization supported several states. Trade links between Carthage and the Berbers in the interior grew, but territorial expansion also resulted in the enslavement or military recruitment of some Berbers and in the extraction of tribute from others. By the early 4th century BC, Berbers formed one of the largest element, with Gauls, of the Carthaginian army.

In the Mercenary War (241-238 BC), a rebellion was instigated by mercenary soldiers of Carthage and African allies. Berber soldiers participated after being unpaid following the defeat of Carthage in the First Punic War. Berbers succeeded in obtaining control of much of Carthage's North African territory, and they minted coins bearing the name Libyan, used in Greek to describe natives of North Africa. The Carthaginian state declined because of successive defeats by the Romans in the Punic Wars; in 146 BC the city of Carthage was destroyed. As Carthaginian power waned, the influence of Berber leaders in the hinterland grew. By the 2nd century BC, several large but loosely administered Berber kingdoms had emerged. Two of them were established in Numidia, behind the coastal areas controlled by Carthage. West of Numidia lay Mauretania, which extended across the Moulouya River in Morocco to the Atlantic Ocean. The high point of Berber civilization, unequaled until the coming of the Almohads and Almoravid dynasty more than a millennium later, was reached during the reign of Masinissa in the 2nd century BC. After Masinissa's death in 148 BC, the Berber kingdoms were divided and reunited several times. Masinissa's line survived until 24 AD, when the remaining Berber territory was annexed to the Roman Empire.

Macrobia and the Barbari City States
 

Macrobia was an ancient kingdom situated in the Horn of Africa (present day Somalia). It is mentioned in the 5th century BC. According to Herodotus' account, the Persian Emperor Cambyses II upon his conquest of Egypt (525 BC) sent ambassadors to Macrobia, bringing luxury gifts for the Macrobian king to entice his submission. The Macrobian ruler, who was elected based at least in part on stature, replied instead with a challenge for his Persian counterpart in the form of an unstrung bow: if the Persians could manage to string it, they would have the right to invade his country; but until then, they should thank the gods that the Macrobians never decided to invade their empire.

The Macrobians were a regional power reputed for their advanced architecture and gold wealth, which was so plentiful that they shackled their prisoners in golden chains.

After the collapse of Macrobia, several wealthy ancient city-states, such as Opone, Essina, Sarapion, Nikon, Malao, Damo and Mosylon near Cape Guardafui would emerge from the 1st millennium BC–500 AD to compete with the Sabaeans, Parthians and Axumites for the wealthy Indo-Greco-Roman trade and flourished along the Somali coast. They developed a lucrative trading network under a region collectively known in the Peripilus of the Erythraean Sea as Barbaria.

Roman North Africa

"Increases in urbanization and in the area under cultivation during Roman rule caused wholesale dislocations of the Berber society, forcing nomad tribes to settle or to move from their traditional rangelands. Sedentary tribes lost their autonomy and connection with the land. Berber opposition to the Roman presence was nearly constant. The Roman emperor Trajan established a frontier in the south by encircling the Aurès and Nemencha mountains and building a line of forts from Vescera (modern Biskra) to Ad Majores (Henchir Besseriani, southeast of Biskra). The defensive line extended at least as far as Castellum Dimmidi (modern Messaâd, southwest of Biskra), Roman Algeria's southernmost fort. Romans settled and developed the area around Sitifis (modern Sétif) in the 2nd century, but farther west the influence of Rome did not extend beyond the coast and principal military roads until much later."

The Roman military presence of North Africa remained relatively small, consisting of about 28,000 troops and auxiliaries in Numidia and the two Mauretanian provinces. Starting in the 2nd century AD, these garrisons were manned mostly by local inhabitants.

Aside from Carthage, urbanization in North Africa came in part with the establishment of settlements of veterans under the Roman emperors Claudius (reigned 41–54), Nerva (96–98), and Trajan (98–117). In Algeria such settlements included Tipasa, Cuicul or Curculum (modern Djemila, northeast of Sétif), Thamugadi (modern Timgad, southeast of Sétif), and Sitifis (modern Sétif). The prosperity of most towns depended on agriculture. Called the "granary of the empire", North Africa became one of the largest exporters of grain in the empire, shipping to the provinces which did not produce cereals, like Italy and Greece. Other crops included fruit, figs, grapes, and beans. By the 2nd century AD, olive oil rivaled cereals as an export item.

The beginnings of the Roman imperial decline seemed less serious in North Africa than elsewhere. However, uprisings did take place. In 238 AD, landowners rebelled unsuccessfully against imperial fiscal policies. Sporadic tribal revolts in the Mauretanian mountains followed from 253 to 288, during the Crisis of the Third Century. The towns also suffered economic difficulties, and building activity almost ceased.

The towns of Roman North Africa had a substantial Jewish population. Some Jews had been deported from Judea or Palestine in the 1st and 2nd centuries AD for rebelling against Roman rule; others had come earlier with Punic settlers. In addition, a number of Berber tribes had converted to Judaism.

Christianity arrived in the 2nd century and soon gained converts in the towns and among slaves. More than eighty bishops, some from distant frontier regions of Numidia, attended the Council of Carthage (256) in 256. By the end of the 4th century, the settled areas had become Christianized, and some Berber tribes had converted en masse.

A division in the church that came to be known as the Donatist heresy began in 313 among Christians in North Africa. The Donatists stressed the holiness of the church and refused to accept the authority to administer the sacraments of those who had surrendered the scriptures when they were forbidden under the Emperor Diocletian (reigned 284–305). The Donatists also opposed the involvement of Constantine the Great (reigned 306–337) in church affairs in contrast to the majority of Christians who welcomed official imperial recognition.

The occasionally violent Donatist controversy has been characterized as a struggle between opponents and supporters of the Roman system. The most articulate North African critic of the Donatist position, which came to be called a heresy, was Augustine, bishop of Hippo Regius. Augustine maintained that the unworthiness of a minister did not affect the validity of the sacraments because their true minister was Jesus Christ. In his sermons and books Augustine, who is considered a leading exponent of Christian dogma, evolved a theory of the right of orthodox Christian rulers to use force against schismatics and heretics. Although the dispute was resolved by a decision of an imperial commission in Carthage in 411, Donatist communities continued to exist as late as the 6th century.

A decline in trade weakened Roman control. Independent kingdoms emerged in mountainous and desert areas, towns were overrun, and Berbers, who had previously been pushed to the edges of the Roman Empire, returned.

During the Vandalic War, Belisarius, general of the Byzantine emperor Justinian I based in Constantinople, landed in North Africa in 533 with 16,000 men and within a year destroyed the Vandal Kingdom. Local opposition delayed full Byzantine control of the region for twelve years, however, and when imperial control came, it was but a shadow of the control exercised by Rome. Although an impressive series of fortifications were built, Byzantine rule was compromised by official corruption, incompetence, military weakness, and lack of concern in Constantinople for African affairs, which made it an easy target for the Arabs during the Early Muslim conquests. As a result, many rural areas reverted to Berber rule.

Aksum

The earliest state in Eritrea and northern Ethiopia, Dʿmt, dates from around the 8th and 7th centuries BC. D'mt traded through the Red Sea with Egypt and the Mediterranean, providing frankincense. By the 5th and 3rd centuries, D'mt had declined, and several successor states took its place. Later there was greater trade with South Arabia, mainly with the port of Saba. Adulis became an important commercial center in the Ethiopian Highlands. The interaction of the peoples in the two regions, the southern Arabia Sabaeans and the northern Ethiopians, resulted in the Ge'ez culture and language and eventual development of the Ge'ez script. Trade links increased and expanded from the Red Sea to the Mediterranean, with Egypt, Israel, Phoenicia, Greece, and Rome, to the Black Sea, and to Persia, India, and China. Aksum was known throughout those lands. By the 5th century BC, the region was very prosperous, exporting ivory, hippopotamus hides, gold dust, spices, and live elephants. It imported silver, gold, olive oil, and wine. Aksum manufactured glass crystal, brass, and copper for export. A powerful Aksum emerged, unifying parts of eastern Sudan, northern Ethiopia (Tigre), and Eritrea. Its kings built stone palatial buildings and were buried under megalithic monuments. By 300 AD, Aksum was minting its own coins in silver and gold.

In 331 AD, King Ezana (320–350 AD) was converted to Miaphysite Christianity which believes in one united divine-human nature of Christ, supposedly by Frumentius and Aedesius, who became stranded on the Red Sea coast. Some scholars believed the process was more complex and gradual than a simple conversion. Around 350, the time Ezana sacked Meroe, the Syrian monastic tradition took root within the Ethiopian church.

In the 6th century Aksum was powerful enough to add Saba on the Arabian peninsula to her empire. At the end of the 6th century, the Sasanian Empire pushed Aksum out of the peninsula. With the spread of Islam through Western Asia and Northern Africa, Aksum's trading networks in the Mediterranean faltered. The Red Sea trade diminished as it was diverted to the Persian Gulf and dominated by Arabs, causing Aksum to decline. By 800 AD, the capital was moved south into the interior highlands, and Aksum was much diminished.

West Africa

In the western Sahel the rise of settled communities occurred largely as a result of the domestication of millet and of sorghum. Archaeology points to sizable urban populations in West Africa beginning in the 2nd millennium BC. Symbiotic trade relations developed before the trans-Saharan trade, in response to the opportunities afforded by north–south diversity in ecosystems across deserts, grasslands, and forests. The agriculturists received salt from the desert nomads. The desert nomads acquired meat and other foods from pastoralists and farmers of the grasslands and from fishermen on the Niger River. The forest-dwellers provided furs and meat.

Dhar Tichitt and Oualata in present-day Mauritania figure prominently among the early urban centers, dated to 2,000 BC. About 500 stone settlements litter the region in the former savannah of the Sahara. Its inhabitants fished and grew millet. It has been found Augustin Holl that the Soninke of the Mandé peoples were likely responsible for constructing such settlements. Around 300 BC the region became more desiccated and the settlements began to decline, most likely relocating to Koumbi Saleh. Architectural evidence and the comparison of pottery styles suggest that Dhar Tichitt was related to the subsequent Ghana Empire. Djenné-Djenno (in present-day Mali) was settled around 300 BC, and the town grew to house a sizable Iron Age population, as evidenced by crowded cemeteries. Living structures were made of sun-dried mud. By 250 BC Djenné-Djenno had become a large, thriving market town. Towns similar to that at Djenne-Jeno also developed at the site of Dia, also in Mali along the Niger River, from around 900 BC.

Farther south, in central Nigeria, around 1,500 BC, the Nok culture developed in Jos Plateau. It was a highly centralized community. The Nok people produced lifelike representations in terracotta, including human heads and human figures, elephants, and other animals. By 500 BC they were smelting iron. By 200 AD the Nok culture had vanished. Based on stylistic similarities with the Nok terracottas, the bronze figurines of the Yoruba kingdom of Ife and those of the Bini kingdom of Benin are now believed to be continuations of the traditions of the earlier Nok culture.

Bantu expansion

The Bantu expansion involved a significant movement of people in African history and in the settling of the continent. People speaking Bantu languages (a branch of the Niger–Congo family) began in the second millennium BC to spread from Cameroon eastward to the Great Lakes region. In the first millennium BC, Bantu languages spread from the Great Lakes to southern and east Africa. One early movement headed south to the upper Zambezi valley in the 2nd century BC. Then Bantu-speakers pushed westward to the savannahs of present-day Angola and eastward into Malawi, Zambia, and Zimbabwe in the 1st century AD. The second thrust from the Great Lakes was eastward, 2,000 years ago, expanding to the Indian Ocean coast, Kenya and Tanzania. The eastern group eventually met the southern migrants from the Great Lakes in Malawi, Zambia, and Zimbabwe. Both groups continued southward, with eastern groups continuing to Mozambique and reaching Maputo in the 2nd century AD, and expanding as far as Durban.

By the later first millennium AD, the expansion had reached the Great Kei River in present-day South Africa. Sorghum, a major Bantu crop, could not thrive under the winter rainfall of Namibia and the western Cape. Khoisan people inhabited the remaining parts of southern Africa.

Medieval and Early Modern (6th to 18th centuries)

Central Africa

Sao civilization

The Sao civilization flourished from about the sixth century BC to as late as the 16th century AD in Central Africa. The Sao lived by the Chari River south of Lake Chad in territory that later became part of present-day Cameroon and Chad. They are the earliest people to have left clear traces of their presence in the territory of modern Cameroon. Today, several ethnic groups of northern Cameroon and southern Chad – but particularly the Sara people – claim descent from the civilization of the Sao. Sao artifacts show that they were skilled workers in bronze, copper, and iron. Finds include bronze sculptures and terracotta statues of human and animal figures, coins, funerary urns, household utensils, jewelry, highly decorated pottery, and spears. The largest Sao archaeological finds have occurred south of Lake Chad.

Kanem Empire

The Kanem Empire was centered in the Chad Basin. It was known as the Kanem Empire from the 9th century AD onward and lasted as the independent kingdom of Bornu until 1893. At its height it encompassed an area covering not only much of Chad, but also parts of modern southern Libya, eastern Niger, northeastern Nigeria, northern Cameroon, parts of South Sudan and the Central African Republic. The history of the Empire is mainly known from the Royal Chronicle or Girgam discovered in 1851 by the German traveller Heinrich Barth. Kanem rose in the 8th century in the region to the north and east of Lake Chad. The Kanem empire went into decline, shrank, and in the 14th century was defeated by Bilala invaders from the Lake Fitri region.

Around the 9th century AD, the central Sudanic Empire of Kanem, with its capital at Njimi, was founded by the Kanuri-speaking nomads. Kanem arose by engaging in the trans-Saharan trade. It exchanged slaves captured by raiding the south for horses from North Africa, which in turn aided in the acquisition of slaves. By the late 11th century, the Islamic Sayfawa (Saifawa) dynasty was founded by Humai (Hummay) ibn Salamna. The Sayfawa dynasty ruled for 771 years, making it one of the longest-lasting dynasties in human history. In addition to trade, taxation of local farms around Kanem became a source of state income. Kanem reached its peak under Mai (king) Dunama Dibalemi ibn Salma (1210–1248). The empire reportedly was able to field 40,000 cavalry, and it extended from Fezzan in the north to the Sao state in the south. Islam became firmly entrenched in the empire. Pilgrimages to Mecca were common; Cairo had hostels set aside specifically for pilgrims from Kanem.

Bornu Empire

The Kanuri people led by the Sayfuwa migrated to the west and south of the lake, where they established the Bornu Empire. By the late 16th century the Bornu empire had expanded and recaptured the parts of Kanem that had been conquered by the Bulala. Satellite states of Bornu included the Damagaram in the west and Baguirmi to the southeast of Lake Chad.

Around 1400, the Sayfawa dynasty moved its capital to Bornu, a tributary state southwest of Lake Chad with a new capital Birni Ngarzagamu. Overgrazing had caused the pastures of Kanem to become too dry. In addition, political rivalry from the Bilala clan was becoming intense. Moving to Bornu better situated the empire to exploit the trans-Saharan trade and to widen its network in that trade. Links to the Hausa states were also established, providing horses and salt from Bilma for Bonoman gold. Mai Ali Gazi ibn Dunama ( – 1503) defeated the Bilala, reestablishing complete control of Kanem. During the early 16th century, the Sayfawa dynasty solidified its hold on the Bornu population after much rebellion. In the latter half of the 16th century, Mai Idris Alooma modernized its military, in contrast to the Songhai Empire. Turkish mercenaries were used to train the military. The Sayfawa dynasty were the first monarchs south of the Sahara to import firearms. The empire controlled all of the Sahel from the borders of Darfur in the east to Hausaland to the west. Friendly relationship was established with the Ottoman Empire via Tripoli. The Mai exchanged gifts with the Ottoman sultan.

During the 17th and 18th centuries, not much is known about Bornu. During the 18th century, it became a center of Islamic learning. However, Bornu's army became outdated by not importing new arms, and Kamembu had also begun its decline. The power of the mai was undermined by droughts and famine that were becoming more intense, internal rebellion in the pastoralist north, growing Hausa power, and the importation of firearms which made warfare more bloody. By 1841, the last mai was deposed, bringing to an end the long-lived Sayfawa dynasty. In its place, the al-Kanemi dynasty of the shehu rose to power.

Shilluk Kingdom

The Shilluk Kingdom was centered in South Sudan from the 15th century from along a strip of land along the western bank of the White Nile, from Lake No to about 12° north latitude. The capital and royal residence was in the town of Fashoda. The kingdom was founded during the mid-15th century AD by its first ruler, Nyikang. During the 19th century, the Shilluk Kingdom faced decline following military assaults from the Ottoman Empire and later British and Sudanese colonization in Anglo-Egyptian Sudan.

Baguirmi Kingdom

The Kingdom of Baguirmi existed as an independent state during the 16th and 17th centuries southeast of Lake Chad in what is now the country of Chad. Baguirmi emerged to the southeast of the Kanem–Bornu Empire. The kingdom's first ruler was Mbang Birni Besse. Later in his reign, the Bornu Empire conquered the state and made it a tributary.

Wadai Empire

The Wadai Empire was centered on Chad and the Central African Republic from the 17th century. The Tunjur people founded the Wadai Kingdom to the east of Bornu in the 16th century. In the 17th century there was a revolt of the Maba people who established a Muslim dynasty.

At first Wadai paid tribute to Bornu and Durfur, but by the 18th century Wadai was fully independent and had become an aggressor against its neighbors.To the west of Bornu, by the 15th century the Kingdom of Kano had become the most powerful of the Hausa Kingdoms, in an unstable truce with the Kingdom of Katsina to the north. Both were absorbed into the Sokoto Caliphate during the Fulani Jihad of 1805, which threatened Bornu itself.

Luba Empire

Sometime between 1300 and 1400 AD, Kongolo Mwamba (Nkongolo) from the Balopwe clan unified the various Luba peoples, near Lake Kisale. He founded the Kongolo dynasty, which was later ousted by Kalala Ilunga. Kalala expanded the kingdom west of Lake Kisale. A new centralized political system of spiritual kings with a court council of head governors and sub-heads all the way to village heads. The  was the direct communicator with the ancestral spirits and chosen by them. Conquered states were integrated into the system and represented in the court, with their titles. The authority of the  resided in his spiritual power rather than his military authority. The army was relatively small. The Luba was able to control regional trade and collect tribute for redistribution. Numerous offshoot states were formed with founders claiming descent from the Luba. The Luba political system spread throughout Central Africa, southern Uganda, Rwanda, Burundi, Malawi, Zambia, Zimbabwe, and the western Congo. Two major empires claiming Luba descent were the Lunda Empire and Maravi Empire. The Bemba people and Basimba people of northern Zambia were descended from Luba migrants who arrived in Zambia during the 17th century.

Lunda Empire

In the 1450s, a Luba from the royal family Ilunga Tshibinda married Lunda queen Rweej and united all Lunda peoples. Their son  Luseeng expanded the kingdom. His son Naweej expanded the empire further and is known as the first Lunda emperor, with the title , the Lord of Vipers. The Luba political system was retained, and conquered peoples were integrated into the system.

Numerous states claimed descent from the Lunda. The Imbangala of inland Angola claimed descent from a founder, Kinguri, brother of Queen Rweej, who could not tolerate the rule of  Tshibunda. Kinguri became the title of kings of states founded by Queen Rweej's brother. The Luena (Lwena) and Lozi (Luyani) in Zambia also claim descent from Kinguri. During the 17th century, a Lunda chief and warrior called Mwata Kazembe set up an Eastern Lunda kingdom in the valley of the Luapula River. The Lunda's western expansion also saw claims of descent by the Yaka and the Pende. The Lunda linked Central Africa with the western coast trade. The kingdom of Lunda came to an end in the 19th century when it was invaded by the Chokwe, who were armed with guns.

Kingdom of Kongo

By the 15th century AD, the farming Bakongo people (ba being the plural prefix) were unified as the Kingdom of Kongo under a ruler called the manikongo, residing in the fertile Pool Malebo area on the lower Congo River. The capital was M'banza-Kongo. With superior organization, they were able to conquer their neighbors and extract tribute. They were experts in metalwork, pottery, and weaving raffia cloth. They stimulated interregional trade via a tribute system controlled by the manikongo. Later, maize (corn) and cassava (manioc) would be introduced to the region via trade with the Portuguese at their ports at Luanda and Benguela. The maize and cassava would result in population growth in the region and other parts of Africa, replacing millet as a main staple.

By the 16th century, the manikongo held authority from the Atlantic in the west to the Kwango River in the east. Each territory was assigned a mani-mpembe (provincial governor) by the manikongo. In 1506, Afonso I (1506–1542), a Christian, took over the throne. Slave trading increased with Afonso's wars of conquest. About 1568 to 1569, the Jaga invaded Kongo, laying waste to the kingdom and forcing the manikongo into exile. In 1574, Manikongo Álvaro I was reinstated with the help of Portuguese mercenaries. During the latter part of the 1660s, the Portuguese tried to gain control of Kongo. Manikongo António I (1661–1665), with a Kongolese army of 5,000, was destroyed by an army of Afro-Portuguese at the Battle of Mbwila. The empire dissolved into petty polities, fighting among each other for war captives to sell into slavery.

Kongo gained captives from the Kingdom of Ndongo in wars of conquest. Ndongo was ruled by the ngola. Ndongo would also engage in slave trading with the Portuguese, with São Tomé being a transit point to Brazil. The kingdom was not as welcoming as Kongo; it viewed the Portuguese with great suspicion and as an enemy. The Portuguese in the latter part of the 16th century tried to gain control of Ndongo but were defeated by the Mbundu. Ndongo experienced depopulation from slave raiding. The leaders established another state at Matamba, affiliated with Queen Nzinga, who put up a strong resistance to the Portuguese until coming to terms with them. The Portuguese settled along the coast as trade dealers, not venturing on conquest of the interior. Slavery wreaked havoc in the interior, with states initiating wars of conquest for captives. The Imbangala formed the slave-raiding state of Kasanje, a major source of slaves during the 17th and 18th centuries.

Horn of Africa

Somalia

The birth of Islam opposite Somalia's Red Sea coast meant that Somali merchants and sailors living on the Arabian Peninsula gradually came under the influence of the new religion through their converted Arab Muslim trading partners. With the migration of Muslim families from the Islamic world to Somalia in the early centuries of Islam, and the peaceful conversion of the Somali population by Somali Muslim scholars in the following centuries, the ancient city-states eventually transformed into Islamic Mogadishu, Berbera, Zeila, Barawa and Merka, which were part of the Barbar (the medieval Arab term for the ancestors of the modern Somalis) civilization. The city of Mogadishu came to be known as the City of Islam and controlled the East African gold trade for several centuries.

During this period, sultanates such as the Ajuran Empire and the Sultanate of Mogadishu, and republics like Barawa, Merca and Hobyo and their respective ports flourished and had a lucrative foreign commerce with ships sailing to and coming from Arabia, India, Venice, Persia, Egypt, Portugal and as far away as China. Vasco da Gama, who passed by Mogadishu in the 15th century, noted that it was a large city with houses four or five stories high and big palaces in its centre, in addition to many mosques with cylindrical minarets.

In the 16th century, Duarte Barbosa noted that many ships from the Kingdom of Cambaya in modern-day India sailed to Mogadishu with cloth and spices, for which they in return received gold, wax, and ivory. Barbosa also highlighted the abundance of meat, wheat, barley, horses, and fruit in the coastal markets, which generated enormous wealth for the merchants. Mogadishu, the center of a thriving weaving industry known as toob benadir (specialized for the markets in Egypt and Syria), together with Merca and Barawa, served as a transit stop for Swahili merchants from Mombasa and Malindi and for the gold trade from Kilwa. Jewish merchants from the Strait of Hormuz brought their Indian textiles and fruit to the Somali coast to exchange for grain and wood.

Trading relations were established with Malacca in the 15th century, with cloth, ambergris, and porcelain being the main commodities of the trade. Giraffes, zebras, and incense were exported to the Ming Empire of China, which established Somali merchants as leaders in the commerce between the Asia and Africa and influenced the Chinese language with borrowings from the Somali language in the process. Hindu merchants from Surat and southeast African merchants from Pate, seeking to bypass both the Portuguese blockade and Omani meddling, used the Somali ports of Merca and Barawa (which were out of the two powers' jurisdiction) to conduct their trade in safety and without any problems.

Ethiopia

The Zagwe dynasty ruled many parts of modern Ethiopia and Eritrea from approximately 1137 to 1270. The name of the dynasty comes from the Cushitic speaking Agaw of northern Ethiopia. From 1270 AD and on for many centuries, the Solomonic dynasty ruled the Ethiopian Empire.

In the early 15th century Ethiopia sought to make diplomatic contact with European kingdoms for the first time since Aksumite times. A letter from King Henry IV of England to the Emperor of Abyssinia survives. In 1428, the Emperor Yeshaq I sent two emissaries to Alfonso V of Aragon, who sent return emissaries who failed to complete the return trip.

The first continuous relations with a European country began in 1508 with the Kingdom of Portugal under Emperor Lebna Dengel, who had just inherited the throne from his father. This proved to be an important development, for when the empire was subjected to the attacks of the Adal general and imam, Ahmad ibn Ibrahim al-Ghazi (called "Grañ", or "the Left-handed"), Portugal assisted the Ethiopian emperor by sending weapons and four hundred men, who helped his son Gelawdewos defeat Ahmad and re-establish his rule. This Abyssinian–Adal War was also one of the first proxy wars in the region as the Ottoman Empire, and Portugal took sides in the conflict.

When Emperor Susenyos converted to Roman Catholicism in 1624, years of revolt and civil unrest followed resulting in thousands of deaths. The Jesuit missionaries had offended the Orthodox faith of the local Ethiopians, and on June 25, 1632, Susenyos's son, Emperor Fasilides, declared the state religion to again be Ethiopian Orthodox Christianity and expelled the Jesuit missionaries and other Europeans.

North Africa

Maghreb

By 711 AD, the Umayyad Caliphate had conquered all of North Africa. By the 10th century, the majority of the population of North Africa was Muslim.

By the 9th century AD, the unity brought about by the Islamic conquest of North Africa and the expansion of Islamic culture came to an end. Conflict arose as to who should be the successor of the prophet. The Umayyads had initially taken control of the Caliphate, with their capital at Damascus. Later, the Abbasids had taken control, moving the capital to Baghdad. The Berber people, being independent in spirit and hostile to outside interference in their affairs and to Arab exclusivity in orthodox Islam, adopted Shi'ite and Kharijite Islam, both considered unorthodox and hostile to the authority of the Abbasid Caliphate. Numerous Kharijite kingdoms came and fell during the 8th and 9th centuries, asserting their independence from Baghdad. In the early 10th century, Shi'ite groups from Syria, claiming descent from Muhammad's daughter Fatimah, founded the Fatimid dynasty in the Maghreb. By 950, they had conquered all of the Maghreb and by 969 all of Egypt. They had immediately broken away from Baghdad.

In an attempt to bring about a purer form of Islam among the Sanhaja Berbers, Abdallah ibn Yasin founded the Almoravid movement in present-day Mauritania and Western Sahara. The Sanhaja Berbers, like the Soninke, practiced an indigenous religion alongside Islam. Abdallah ibn Yasin found ready converts in the Lamtuna Sanhaja, who were dominated by the Soninke in the south and the Zenata Berbers in the north. By the 1040s, all of the Lamtuna was converted to the Almoravid movement. With the help of Yahya ibn Umar and his brother Abu Bakr ibn Umar, the sons of the Lamtuna chief, the Almoravids created an empire extending from the Sahel to the Mediterranean. After the death of Abdallah ibn Yassin and Yahya ibn Umar, Abu Bakr split the empire in half, between himself and Yusuf ibn Tashfin, because it was too big to be ruled by one individual. Abu Bakr took the south to continue fighting the Soninke, and Yusuf ibn Tashfin took the north, expanding it to southern Spain. The death of Abu Bakr in 1087 saw a breakdown of unity and increase military dissension in the south. This caused a re-expansion of the Soninke. The Almoravids were once held responsible for bringing down the Ghana Empire in 1076, but this view is no longer credited.

During the 10th through 13th centuries, there was a large-scale movement of bedouins out of the Arabian Peninsula. About 1050, a quarter of a million Arab nomads from Egypt moved into the Maghreb. Those following the northern coast were referred to as Banu Hilal. Those going south of the Atlas Mountains were the Banu Sulaym. This movement spread the use of the Arabic language and hastened the decline of the Berber language and the Arabisation of North Africa. Later an Arabised Berber group, the Hawwara, went south to Nubia via Egypt.

In the 1140s, Abd al-Mu'min declared jihad on the Almoravids, charging them with decadence and corruption. He united the northern Berbers against the Almoravids, overthrowing them and forming the Almohad Empire. During this period, the Maghreb became thoroughly Islamised and saw the spread of literacy, the development of algebra, and the use of the number zero and decimals. By the 13th century, the Almohad states had split into three rival states. Muslim states were largely extinguished in the Iberian Peninsula by the Christian kingdoms of Castile, Aragon, and Portugal. Around 1415, Portugal engaged in a reconquista of North Africa by capturing Ceuta, and in later centuries Spain and Portugal acquired other ports on the North African coast. In 1492, at the end of the Granada War, Spain defeated Muslims in the Emirate of Granada, effectively ending eight centuries of Muslim domination in southern Iberia.

. The pashas of Tripoli traded horses, firearms, and armor via Fez with the sultans of the Bornu Empire for slaves.

In the 16th century, an Arab nomad tribe that claimed descent from Muhammad's daughter, the Saadis, conquered and united Morocco. They prevented the Ottoman Empire from reaching to the Atlantic and expelled Portugal from Morocco's western coast. Ahmad al-Mansur brought the state to the height of its power. He invaded Songhay in 1591, to control the gold trade, which had been diverted to the western coast of Africa for European ships and to the east, to Tunis. Morocco's hold on Songhay diminished in the 17th century. In 1603, after Ahmad's death, the kingdom split into the two sultanates of Fes and Marrakesh. Later it was reunited by Moulay al-Rashid, founder of the Alaouite dynasty (1672–1727). His brother and successor, Ismail ibn Sharif (1672–1727), strengthened the unity of the country by importing slaves from the Sudan to build up the military.

Nile Valley

Egypt

In 642 AD, the Rashidun Caliphate conquered Byzantine Egypt.

Egypt under the Fatimid Caliphate was prosperous. Dams and canals were repaired, and wheat, barley, flax, and cotton production increased. Egypt became a major producer of linen and cotton cloth. Its Mediterranean and Red Sea trade increased. Egypt also minted a gold currency called the Fatimid dinar, which was used for international trade. The bulk of revenues came from taxing the fellahin (peasant farmers), and taxes were high. Tax collecting was leased to Berber overlords, who were soldiers who had taken part in the Fatimid conquest in 969 AD. The overlords paid a share to the caliphs and retained what was left. Eventually, they became landlords and constituted a settled land aristocracy.

To fill the military ranks, Mamluk Turkish slave cavalry and Sudanese slave infantry were used. Berber freemen were also recruited. In the 1150s, tax revenues from farms diminished. The soldiers revolted and wreaked havoc in the countryside, slowed trade, and diminished the power and authority of the Fatimid caliphs.

During the 1160s, Fatimid Egypt came under threat from European crusaders. Out of this threat, a Kurdish general named Ṣalāḥ ad-Dīn Yūsuf ibn Ayyūb (Saladin), with a small band of professional soldiers, emerged as an outstanding Muslim defender. Saladin defeated the Christian crusaders at Egypt's borders and recaptured Jerusalem in 1187. On the death of Al-Adid, the last Fatimid caliph, in 1171, Saladin became the ruler of Egypt, ushering in the Ayyubid dynasty. Under his rule, Egypt returned to Sunni Islam, Cairo became an important center of Arab Islamic learning, and Mamluk slaves were increasingly recruited from Turkey and southern Russia for military service. Support for the military was tied to the iqta, a form of land taxation in which soldiers were given ownership in return for military service.

Over time, Mamluk slave soldiers became a very powerful landed aristocracy, to the point of getting rid of the Ayyubid dynasty in 1250 and establishing a Mamluk dynasty. The more powerful Mamluks were referred to as amirs. For 250 years, Mamluks controlled all of Egypt under a military dictatorship. Egypt extended her territories to Syria and Palestine, thwarted the crusaders, and halted a Mongol invasion in 1260 at the Battle of Ain Jalut. Mamluk Egypt came to be viewed as a protector of Islam, and of Medina and Mecca. Eventually the iqta system declined and proved unreliable for providing an adequate military. The Mamluks started viewing their iqta as hereditary and became attuned to urban living. Farm production declined, and dams and canals lapsed into disrepair. Mamluk military skill and technology did not keep pace with new technology of handguns and cannons.

With the rise of the Ottoman Empire, Egypt was easily defeated. In 1517, at the end of an Ottoman–Mamluk War, Egypt became part of the Ottoman Empire. The Istanbul government revived the iqta system. Trade was reestablished in the Red Sea, but it could not completely connect with the Indian Ocean trade because of growing Portuguese presence. During the 17th and 18th centuries, hereditary Mamluks regained power. The leading Mamluks were referred to as beys. Pashas, or viceroys, represented the Istanbul government in name only, operating independently. During the 18th century, dynasties of pashas became established. The government was weak and corrupt.

In 1798, Napoleon invaded Egypt. The local forces had little ability to resist the French conquest. However, the British Empire and the Ottoman Empire were able to remove French occupation in 1801. These events marked the beginning of a 19th-century Anglo-Franco rivalry over Egypt.

Sudan

Christian and Islamic Nubia

After Ezana of Aksum sacked Meroe, people associated with the site of Ballana moved into Nubia from the southwest and founded three kingdoms: Makuria, Nobatia, and Alodia. They would rule for 200 years. Makuria was above the third cataract, along the Dongola Reach with its capital at Dongola. Nobadia was to the north with its capital at Faras, and Alodia was to the south with its capital at Soba. Makuria eventually absorbed Nobadia. The people of the region converted to Monophysite Christianity around 500 to 600 CE. The church initially started writing in Coptic, then in Greek, and finally in Old Nubian, a Nilo-Saharan language. The church was aligned with the Egyptian Coptic Church.

By 641, Egypt was conquered by the Rashidun Caliphate. This effectively blocked Christian Nubia and Aksum from Mediterranean Christendom. In 651–652, Arabs from Egypt invaded Christian Nubia. Nubian archers soundly defeated the invaders. The Baqt (or Bakt) Treaty was drawn, recognizing Christian Nubia and regulating trade. The treaty controlled relations between Christian Nubia and Islamic Egypt for almost six hundred years.

By the 13th century, Christian Nubia began its decline. The authority of the monarchy was diminished by the church and nobility. Arab bedouin tribes began to infiltrate Nubia, causing further havoc. Fakirs (holy men) practicing Sufism introduced Islam into Nubia. By 1366, Nubia had become divided into petty fiefdoms when it was invaded by Mamluks. During the 15th century, Nubia was open to Arab immigration. Arab nomads intermingled with the population and introduced the Arab culture and the Arabic language. By the 16th century, Makuria and Nobadia had been Islamized. During the 16th century, Abdallah Jamma headed an Arab confederation that destroyed Soba, capital of Alodia, the last holdout of Christian Nubia. Later Alodia would fall under the Funj Sultanate.

During the 15th century, Funj herders migrated north to Alodia and occupied it. Between 1504 and 1505, the kingdom expanded, reaching its peak and establishing its capital at Sennar under Badi II Abu Daqn ( – 1680). By the end of the 16th century, the Funj had converted to Islam. They pushed their empire westward to Kordofan. They expanded eastward, but were halted by Ethiopia. They controlled Nubia down to the 3rd Cataract. The economy depended on captured enemies to fill the army and on merchants travelling through Sennar. Under Badi IV (1724–1762), the army turned on the king, making him nothing but a figurehead. In 1821, the Funj were conquered by Muhammad Ali (1805–1849), Pasha of Egypt.

Southern Africa

Settlements of Bantu-speaking peoples who were iron-using agriculturists and herdsmen were long already well established south of the Limpopo River by the 4th century CE, displacing and absorbing the original Khoisan speakers. They slowly moved south, and the earliest ironworks in modern-day KwaZulu-Natal Province are believed to date from around 1050. The southernmost group was the Xhosa people, whose language incorporates certain linguistic traits from the earlier Khoi-San people, reaching the Great Fish River in today's Eastern Cape Province.

Great Zimbabwe and Mapungubwe

The Kingdom of Mapungubwe was the first state in Southern Africa, with its capital at Mapungubwe. The state arose in the 12th century CE. Its wealth came from controlling the trade in ivory from the Limpopo Valley, copper from the mountains of northern Transvaal, and gold from the Zimbabwe Plateau between the Limpopo and Zambezi rivers, with the Swahili merchants at Chibuene. By the mid-13th century, Mapungubwe was abandoned.

After the decline of Mapungubwe, Great Zimbabwe rose on the Zimbabwe Plateau. Zimbabwe means stone building. Great Zimbabwe was the first city in Southern Africa and was the center of an empire, consolidating lesser Shona polities. Stone building was inherited from Mapungubwe. These building techniques were enhanced and came into maturity at Great Zimbabwe, represented by the wall of the Great Enclosure. The dry-stack stone masonry technology was also used to build smaller compounds in the area. Great Zimbabwe flourished by trading with Swahili Kilwa and Sofala. The rise of Great Zimbabwe parallels the rise of Kilwa. Great Zimbabwe was a major source of gold. Its royal court lived in luxury, wore Indian cotton, surrounded themselves with copper and gold ornaments, and ate on plates from as far away as Persia and China. Around the 1420s and 1430s, Great Zimbabwe was on decline. The city was abandoned by 1450. Some have attributed the decline to the rise of the trading town Ingombe Ilede.

A new chapter of Shona history ensued. Nyatsimba Mutota, a northern Shona king of the Karanga, engaged in conquest. He and his son Mutope conquered the Zimbabwe Plateau, going through Mozambique to the east coast, linking the empire to the coastal trade. They called their empire Wilayatu 'l Mu'anamutapah or mwanamutapa (Lord of the Plundered Lands), or the Kingdom of Mutapa. Monomotapa was the Portuguese corruption. They did not build stone structures; the northern Shonas had no traditions of building in stone. After the death of Matope in 1480, the empire split into two small empires: Torwa in the south and Mutapa in the north. The split occurred over rivalry from two Shona lords, Changa and Togwa, with the mwanamutapa line. Changa was able to acquire the south, forming the Kingdom of Butua with its capital at Khami.

The Mutapa Empire continued in the north under the mwenemutapa line. During the 16th century the Portuguese were able to establish permanent markets up the Zambezi River in an attempt to gain political and military control of Mutapa. They were partially successful. In 1628, a decisive battle allowed them to put a puppet mwanamutapa named Mavura, who signed treaties that gave favorable mineral export rights to the Portuguese. The Portuguese were successful in destroying the mwanamutapa system of government and undermining trade. By 1667, Mutapa was in decay. Chiefs would not allow digging for gold because of fear of Portuguese theft, and the population declined.

The Kingdom of Butua was ruled by a changamire, a title derived from the founder, Changa. Later it became the Rozwi Empire. The Portuguese tried to gain a foothold but were thrown out of the region in 1693, by Changamire Dombo. The 17th century was a period of peace and prosperity. The Rozwi Empire fell into ruins in the 1830s from invading Nguni from Natal.

Namibia

By 1500 AD, most of southern Africa had established states. In northwestern Namibia, the Ovambo engaged in farming and the Herero engaged in herding. As cattle numbers increased, the Herero moved southward to central Namibia for grazing land. A related group, the Ovambanderu, expanded to Ghanzi in northwestern Botswana. The Nama, a Khoi-speaking, sheep-raising group, moved northward and came into contact with the Herero; this would set the stage for much conflict between the two groups. The expanding Lozi states pushed the Mbukushu, Subiya, and Yei to Botei, Okavango, and Chobe in northern Botswana.

South Africa and Botswana

Sotho–Tswana

The development of Sotho–Tswana states based on the highveld, south of the Limpopo River, began around 1000 CE. The chief's power rested on cattle and his connection to the ancestor. This can be seen in the Toutswemogala Hill settlements with stone foundations and stone walls, north of the highveld and south of the Vaal River. Northwest of the Vaal River developed early Tswana states centered on towns of thousands of people. When disagreements or rivalry arose, different groups moved to form their own states.

Nguni peoples

Southeast of the Drakensberg mountains lived Nguni-speaking peoples (Zulu, Xhosa, Swazi, and Ndebele). They too engaged in state building, with new states developing from rivalry, disagreements, and population pressure causing movement into new regions. This 19th-century process of warfare, state building and migration later became known as the Mfecane (Nguni) or Difaqane (Sotho). Its major catalyst was the consolidation of the Zulu Kingdom. They were metalworkers, cultivators of millet, and cattle herders.

Khoisan and Boers

The Khoisan lived in the southwestern Cape Province, where winter rainfall is plentiful. Earlier Khoisan populations were absorbed by Bantu peoples, such as the Sotho and Nguni, but the Bantu expansion stopped at the region with winter rainfall. Some Bantu languages have incorporated the click consonant of the Khoisan languages. The Khoisan traded with their Bantu neighbors, providing cattle, sheep, and hunted items. In return, their Bantu speaking neighbors traded copper, iron, and tobacco.

By the 16th century, the Dutch East India Company established a replenishing station at Table Bay for restocking water and purchasing meat from the Khoikhoi. The Khoikhoi received copper, iron, tobacco, and beads in exchange. In order to control the price of meat and stock and make service more consistent, the Dutch established a permanent settlement at Table Bay in 1652. They grew fresh fruit and vegetables and established a hospital for sick sailors. To increase produce, the Dutch decided to increase the number of farms at Table Bay by encouraging freeburgher boers (farmers) on lands worked initially by slaves from West Africa. The land was taken from Khoikhoi grazing land, triggering the first Khoikhoi-Dutch war in 1659. No victors emerged, but the Dutch assumed a "right of conquest" by which they claimed all of the cape. In a series of wars pitting the Khoikhoi against each other, the Boers assumed all Khoikhoi land and claimed all their cattle. The second Khoikoi-Dutch war (1673–1677) was a cattle raid. The Khoikhoi also died in thousands from European diseases.

By the 18th century, the cape colony had grown, with slaves coming from Madagascar, Mozambique, and Indonesia. The settlement also started to expand northward, but Khoikhoi resistance, raids, and guerrilla warfare slowed the expansion during the 18th century. Boers who started to practice pastoralism were known as trekboers. A common source of trekboer labor was orphan children who were captured during raids and whose parents had been killed.

Southeast Africa

Prehistory

According to the theory of recent African origin of modern humans, the mainstream position held within the scientific community, all humans originate from either Southeast Africa or the Horn of Africa. During the first millennium CE, Nilotic and Bantu-speaking peoples moved into the region.

Swahili coast

Following the Bantu Migration, on the coastal section of Southeast Africa, a mixed Bantu community developed through contact with Muslim Arab and Persian traders, leading to the development of the mixed Arab, Persian and African Swahili City States. The Swahili culture that emerged from these exchanges evinces many Arab and Islamic influences not seen in traditional Bantu culture, as do the many Afro-Arab members of the Bantu Swahili people. With its original speech community centered on the coastal parts of Tanzania (particularly Zanzibar) and Kenya—a seaboard referred to as the Swahili Coast—the Bantu Swahili language contains many Arabic language loan-words as a consequence of these interactions.

The earliest Bantu inhabitants of the Southeast coast of Kenya and Tanzania encountered by these later Arab and Persian settlers have been variously identified with the trading settlements of Rhapta, Azania and Menouthias referenced in early Greek and Chinese writings from 50 AD to 500 AD, ultimately giving rise to the name for Tanzania. These early writings perhaps document the first wave of Bantu settlers to reach Southeast Africa during their migration.

Historically, the Swahili people could be found as far north as northern Kenya and as far south as the Ruvuma River in Mozambique. Arab geographers referred to the Swahili coast as the land of the zanj (blacks).

Although once believed to be the descendants of Persian colonists, the ancient Swahili are now recognized by most historians, historical linguists, and archaeologists as a Bantu people who had sustained important interactions with Muslim merchants, beginning in the late 7th and early 8th centuries AD.

Medieval Swahili kingdoms are known to have had island trade ports, described by Greek historians as "metropolises", and to have established regular trade routes with the Islamic world and Asia. Ports such as Mombasa, Zanzibar, and Kilwa were known to Chinese sailors under Zheng He and medieval Islamic geographers such as the Berber traveller Abu Abdullah ibn Battuta. The main Swahili exports were ivory, slaves, and gold. They traded with Arabia, India, Persia, and China.

The Portuguese arrived in 1498. On a mission to economically control and Christianize the Swahili coast, the Portuguese attacked Kilwa first in 1505 and other cities later. Because of Swahili resistance, the Portuguese attempt at establishing commercial control was never successful. By the late 17th century, Portuguese authority on the Swahili coast began to diminish. With the help of Omani Arabs, by 1729 the Portuguese presence had been removed. The Swahili coast eventually became part of the Sultanate of Oman. Trade recovered, but it did not regain the levels of the past.

Urewe

The Urewe culture developed and spread in and around the Lake Victoria region of Africa during the African Iron Age. The culture's earliest dated artifacts are located in the Kagera Region of Tanzania, and it extended as far west as the Kivu region of the Democratic Republic of the Congo, as far east as the Nyanza and Western provinces of Kenya, and north into Uganda, Rwanda and Burundi. Sites from the Urewe culture date from the Early Iron Age, from the 5th century BC to the 6th century AD.

The origins of the Urewe culture are ultimately in the Bantu expansion originating in Cameroon. Research into early Iron Age civilizations in Sub-Saharan Africa has been undertaken concurrently with studies on African linguistics on Bantu expansion. The Urewe culture may correspond to the Eastern subfamily of Bantu languages, spoken by the descendants of the first wave of Bantu peoples to settle East Africa. At first sight, Urewe seems to be a fully developed civilization recognizable through its distinctive, stylish earthenware and highly technical and sophisticated iron working techniques. Given our current level of knowledge, neither seems to have developed or altered for nearly 2,000 years. However, minor local variations in the ceramic ware can be observed.

Urewe is the name of the site in Kenya brought to prominence through the publication in 1948 of Mary Leakey's archaeological findings. She described the early Iron Age period in the Great Lakes region in Central East Africa around Lake Victoria.

Madagascar and Merina

Madagascar was apparently first settled by Austronesian speakers from Southeast Asia before the 6th century AD and subsequently by Bantu speakers from the east African mainland in the 6th or 7th century, according to archaeological and linguistic data. The Austronesians introduced banana and rice cultivation, and the Bantu speakers introduced cattle and other farming practices. About the year 1000, Arab and Indian trade settlement were started in northern Madagascar to exploit the Indian Ocean trade. By the 14th century, Islam was introduced on the island by traders. Madagascar functioned in the East African medieval period as a contact port for the other Swahili seaport city-states such as Sofala, Kilwa, Mombasa, and Zanzibar.

Several kingdoms emerged after the 15th century: the Sakalava Kingdom (16th century) on the west coast, Tsitambala Kingdom (17th century) on the east coast, and Merina (15th century) in the central highlands. By the 19th century, Merina controlled the whole island. In 1500, the Portuguese were the first Europeans on the island, raiding the trading settlements.

The British and later the French arrived. During the latter part of the 17th century, Madagascar was a popular transit point for pirates. Radama I (1810–1828) invited Christian missionaries in the early 19th century. Queen Ranavalona I "the Cruel" (1828–1861) banned the practice of Christianity in the kingdom, and an estimated 150,000 Christians perished. Under Radama II (1861–1863), Madagascar took a French orientation, with great commercial concession given to the French. In 1895, in the second Franco-Hova War, the French invaded Madagascar, taking over Antsiranana (Diego Suarez) and declaring Madagascar a protectorate.

Lake Plateau states and empires

Between the 14th and 15th centuries, large Southeast African kingdoms and states emerged, such as the Buganda and Karagwe Kingdoms of Uganda and Tanzania.

Empire of Kitara

By 1000 AD, numerous states had arisen on the Lake Plateau among the Great Lakes of East Africa. Cattle herding, cereal growing, and banana cultivation were the economic mainstays of these states. The Ntusi and Bigo earthworks are representative of one of the first states, the Bunyoro kingdom, which oral tradition stipulates was part of the Empire of Kitara that dominated the whole Lakes region. A Luo ethnic elite, from the Babito clan, ruled over the Bantu-speaking Nyoro people. The society was essentially Nyoro in its culture, based on the evidence from pottery, settlement patterns, and economic specialization.

The Babito clan claim legitimacy by being descended from the Bachwezi clan, who were said to have ruled the Empire of Kitara.

Buganda

The Buganda kingdom was founded by Kato Kimera around the 14th century AD. Kato Kintu may have migrated to the northwest of Lake Victoria as early as 1000 BC. Buganda was ruled by the kabaka with a bataka composed of the clan heads. Over time, the kabakas diluted the authority of the bataka, with Buganda becoming a centralized monarchy. By the 16th century, Buganda was engaged in expansion but had a serious rival in Bunyoro. By the 1870s, Buganda was a wealthy nation-state. The kabaka ruled with his Lukiko (council of ministers). Buganda had a naval fleet of a hundred vessels, each manned by thirty men. Buganda supplanted Bunyoro as the most important state in the region. However, by the early 20th century, Buganda became a province of the British Uganda Protectorate.

Rwanda

Southeast of Bunyoro, near Lake Kivu at the bottom of the western rift, the Kingdom of Rwanda was founded, perhaps during the 17th century. Tutsi (BaTutsi) pastoralists formed the elite, with a king called the mwami. The Hutu (BaHutu) were farmers. Both groups spoke the same language, but there were strict social norms against marrying each other and interaction. According to oral tradition, the Kingdom of Rwanda was founded by Mwami Ruganzu II (Ruganzu Ndori) ( – 1624), with his capital near Kigali. It took 200 years to attain a truly centralized kingdom under Mwami Kigeli IV (Kigeri Rwabugiri) (1840–1895). Subjugation of the Hutu proved more difficult than subduing the Tutsi. The last Tutsi chief gave up to Mwami Mutara II (Mutara Rwogera) (1802–1853) in 1852, but the last Hutu holdout was conquered in the 1920s by Mwami Yuhi V (Yuli Musinga) (1896–1931).

Burundi

South of the Kingdom of Rwanda was the Kingdom of Burundi. It was founded by the Tutsi chief Ntare Rushatsi ( – 1705). Like Rwanda, Burundi was built on cattle raised by Tutsi pastoralists, crops from Hutu farmers, conquest, and political innovations. Under Mwami Ntare Rugaamba ( – 1852), Burundi pursued an aggressive expansionist policy, one based more on diplomacy than force.

Maravi

The Maravi claimed descent from Karonga (kalonga), who took that title as king. The Maravi connected Central Africa to the east coastal trade, with Swahili Kilwa. By the 17th century, the Maravi Empire encompassed all the area between Lake Malawi and the mouth of the Zambezi River. The karonga was Mzura, who did much to extend the empire. Mzura made a pact with the Portuguese to establish a 4,000-man army to attack the Shona in return for aid in defeating his rival Lundi, a chief of the Zimba. In 1623, he turned on the Portuguese and assisted the Shona. In 1640, he welcomed back the Portuguese for trade. The Maravi Empire did not long survive the death of Mzura. By the 18th century, it had broken into its previous polities.

West Africa

Sahelian empires and states

Ghana

The Ghana Empire may have been an established kingdom as early as the 8th century AD, founded among the Soninke by Dinge Cisse. Ghana was first mentioned by Arab geographer Al-Farazi in the late 8th century. Ghana was inhabited by urban dwellers and rural farmers. The urban dwellers were the administrators of the empire, who were Muslims, and the Ghana (king), who practiced traditional religion. Two towns existed, one where the Muslim administrators and Berber-Arabs lived, which was connected by a stone-paved road to the king's residence. The rural dwellers lived in villages, which joined into broader polities that pledged loyalty to the Ghana. The Ghana was viewed as divine, and his physical well-being reflected on the whole society. Ghana converted to Islam around 1050, after conquering Aoudaghost.

The Ghana Empire grew wealthy by taxing the trans-Saharan trade that linked Tiaret and Sijilmasa to Aoudaghost. Ghana controlled access to the goldfields of Bambouk, southeast of Koumbi Saleh. A percentage of salt and gold going through its territory was taken. The empire was not involved in production.

By the 11th century, Ghana was in decline. It was once thought that the sacking of Koumbi Saleh by Berbers under the Almoravid dynasty in 1076 was the cause. This is no longer accepted. Several alternative explanations are cited. One important reason is the transfer of the gold trade east to the Niger River and the Taghaza Trail, and Ghana's consequent economic decline. Another reason cited is political instability through rivalry among the different hereditary polities.
The empire came to an end in 1230, when Takrur in northern Senegal took over the capital.

Mali

Sundiata continued his conquest from the fertile forests and Niger Valley, east to the Niger Bend, north into the Sahara, and west to the Atlantic Ocean, absorbing the remains of the Ghana Empire. Sundiata took on the title of mansa. He established the capital of his empire at Niani.

Although the salt and gold trade continued to be important to the Mali Empire, agriculture and pastoralism was also critical. The growing of sorghum, millet, and rice was a vital function. On the northern borders of the Sahel, grazing cattle, sheep, goats, and camels were major activities. Mande society was organize around the village and land. A cluster of villages was called a kafu, ruled by a farma. The farma paid tribute to the mansa. A dedicated army of elite cavalry and infantry maintained order, commanded by the royal court. A formidable force could be raised from tributary regions, if necessary.

Conversion to Islam was a gradual process. The power of the mansa depended on upholding traditional beliefs and a spiritual foundation of power. Sundiata initially kept Islam at bay. Later mansas were devout Muslims but still acknowledged traditional deities and took part in traditional rituals and festivals, which were important to the Mande. Islam became a court religion under Sundiata's son Uli I (1225–1270). Mansa Uli made a pilgrimage to Mecca, becoming recognized within the Muslim world. The court was staffed with literate Muslims as secretaries and accountants. Muslim traveller Ibn Battuta left vivid descriptions of the empire.

Mali reached the peak of its power and extent in the 14th century, when Mansa Musa (1312–1337) made his famous hajj to Mecca with 500 slaves, each holding a bar of gold worth 500 mitqals. Mansa Musa's hajj devalued gold in Mamluk Egypt for a decade. He made a great impression on the minds of the Muslim and European world. He invited scholars and architects like Ishal al-Tuedjin (al-Sahili) to further integrate Mali into the Islamic world.

The Mali Empire saw an expansion of learning and literacy. In 1285, Sakura, a freed slave, usurped the throne. This mansa drove the Tuareg out of Timbuktu and established it as a center of learning and commerce. The book trade increased, and book copying became a very respectable and profitable profession. Timbuktu and Djenné became important centers of learning within the Islamic world.

After the reign of Mansa Suleyman (1341–1360), Mali began its spiral downward. Mossi cavalry raided the exposed southern border. Tuareg harassed the northern border in order to retake Timbuktu. Fulani (Fulbe) eroded Mali's authority in the west by establishing the independent Imamate of Futa Toro, a successor to the kingdom of Takrur. Serer and Wolof alliances were broken. In 1545 to 1546, the Songhai Empire took Niani. After 1599, the empire lost the Bambouk goldfields and disintegrated into petty polities.

Songhai

The Songhai people are descended from fishermen on the Middle Niger River. They established their capital at Kukiya in the 9th century AD and at Gao in the 12th century. The Songhai speak a Nilo-Saharan language.

Sonni Ali, a Songhai, began his conquest by capturing Timbuktu in 1468 from the Tuareg. He extended the empire to the north, deep into the desert, pushed the Mossi further south of the Niger, and expanded southwest to Djenne. His army consisted of cavalry and a fleet of canoes. Sonni Ali was not a pious Muslim, and he was portrayed negatively by Berber-Arab scholars, especially for attacking Muslim Timbuktu after having protected and saved them from the Tuareg occupation. After his death in 1492, his heirs were deposed by his nephew a General Askia Mohammad I, son of kassey, a Sonni Ali sister.

Muhammad Ture (1493–1528) founded the Askiya dynasty, askiya being the title of the king. He consolidated the conquests of Sonni Ali. Islam was used to extend his authority by declaring jihad on the Mossi, reviving the trans-Saharan trade, and having the Abbasid "shadow" caliph in Cairo declare him as caliph of Sudan. He established Timbuktu as a great center of Islamic learning. Muhammad Ture expanded the empire by pushing the Tuareg north, capturing Aïr in the east, and capturing salt-producing Taghaza. He brought the Hausa states into the Songhay trading network. He further centralized the administration of the empire by selecting administrators from loyal servants and families and assigning them to conquered territories. They were responsible for raising local militias. Centralization made Songhay very stable, even during dynastic disputes. Leo Africanus left vivid descriptions of the empire under Askiya Muhammad. Askiya Muhammad was deposed by his son in 1528. After much rivalry, Muhammad Ture's last son Askiya Daoud (1529–1582) assumed the throne.

In 1591, Morocco invaded the Songhai Empire under Ahmad al-Mansur of the Saadi dynasty in order to secure the goldfields of the Sahel. At the Battle of Tondibi, the Songhai army was defeated. The Moroccans captured Djenne, Gao, and Timbuktu, but they were unable to secure the whole region. Askiya Nuhu and the Songhay army regrouped at Dendi in the heart of Songhai territory where a spirited guerrilla resistance sapped the resources of the Moroccans, who were dependent upon constant resupply from Morocco. Songhai split into several states during the 17th century.

Morocco found its venture unprofitable. The gold trade had been diverted to Europeans on the coast. Most of the trans-Saharan trade was now diverted east to Bornu. Expensive equipment purchased with gold had to be sent across the Sahara, an unsustainable scenario. The Moroccans who remained married into the population and were referred to as Arma or Ruma. They established themselves at Timbuktu as a military caste with various fiefs, independent from Morocco. Amid the chaos, other groups began to assert themselves, including the Fulani of Futa Tooro who encroached from the west. The Bambara Empire, one of the states that broke from Songhai, sacked Gao. In 1737, the Tuareg massacred the Arma.

Sokoto Caliphate

The Fulani were migratory people. They moved from Mauritania and settled in Futa Tooro, Futa Djallon, and subsequently throughout the rest of West Africa. By the 14th century CE, they had converted to Islam. During the 16th century, they established themselves at Macina in southern Mali. During the 1670s, they declared jihads on non-Muslims. Several states were formed from these jihadist wars, at Futa Toro, Futa Djallon, Macina, Oualia, and Bundu. The most important of these states was the Sokoto Caliphate or Fulani Empire.

In the city of Gobir, Usman dan Fodio (1754–1817) accused the Hausa leadership of practicing an impure version of Islam and of being morally corrupt. In 1804, he launched the Fulani War as a jihad among a population that was restless about high taxes and discontented with its leaders. Jihad fever swept northern Nigeria, with strong support among both the Fulani and the Hausa. Usman created an empire that included parts of northern Nigeria, Benin, and Cameroon, with Sokoto as its capital. He retired to teach and write and handed the empire to his son Muhammed Bello. The Sokoto Caliphate lasted until 1903 when the British conquered northern Nigeria.

Forest empires and states

Akan kingdoms and emergence of Asante Empire

The Akan speak a Kwa language. The speakers of Kwa languages are believed to have come from East/Central Africa, before settling in the Sahel. By the 12th century, the Akan Kingdom of Bonoman (Bono State) was established. During the 13th century, when the gold mines in modern-day Mali started to dry up, Bonoman and later other Akan states began to rise to prominence as the major players in the Gold trade. It was Bonoman and other Akan kingdoms like Denkyira, Akyem, Akwamu which were the predecessors, and later the emergence of the Empire of Ashanti. When and how the Ashante got to their present location is debatable. What is known is that by the 17th century an Akan people were identified as living in a state called Kwaaman. The location of the state was north of Lake Bosomtwe. The state's revenue was mainly derived from trading in gold and kola nuts and clearing forest to plant yams. They built towns between the Pra and Ofin rivers. They formed alliances for defense and paid tribute to Denkyira one of the more powerful Akan states at that time along with Adansi and Akwamu. During the 16th century, Ashante society experienced sudden changes, including population growth because of cultivation of New World plants such as cassava and maize and an increase in the gold trade between the coast and the north.

By the 17th century, Osei Kofi Tutu I ( – 1717), with help of Okomfo Anokye, unified what became the Ashante into a confederation with the Golden Stool as a symbol of their unity and spirit. Osei Tutu engaged in a massive territorial expansion. He built up the Ashante army based on the Akan state of Akwamu, introducing new organization and turning a disciplined militia into an effective fighting machine. In 1701, the Ashante conquered Denkyira, giving them access to the coastal trade with Europeans, especially the Dutch. Opoku Ware I (1720–1745) engaged in further expansion, adding other southern Akan states to the growing empire. He turned north adding Techiman, Banda, Gyaaman, and Gonja, states on the Black Volta. Between 1744 and 1745, Asantehene Opoku attacked the powerful northern state of Dagomba, gaining control of the important middle Niger trade routes. Kusi Obodom (1750–1764) succeeded Opoku. He solidified all the newly won territories. Osei Kwadwo (1777–1803) imposed administrative reforms that allowed the empire to be governed effectively and to continue its military expansion. Osei Kwame Panyin (1777–1803), Osei Tutu Kwame (1804–1807), and Osei Bonsu (1807–1824) continued territorial consolidation and expansion. The Ashante Empire included all of present-day Ghana and large parts of the Ivory Coast.

The Ashantehene inherited his position from his mother. He was assisted at the capital, Kumasi, by a civil service of men talented in trade, diplomacy, and the military, with a head called the Gyaasehene. Men from Arabia, Sudan, and Europe were employed in the civil service, all of them appointed by the Ashantehene. At the capital and in other towns, the ankobia or special police were used as bodyguards to the Ashantehene, as sources of intelligence, and to suppress rebellion. Communication throughout the empire was maintained via a network of well-kept roads from the coast to the middle Niger and linking together other trade cities.

For most of the 19th century, the Ashante Empire remained powerful. It was later destroyed in 1900 by British superior weaponry and organization following the four Anglo-Ashanti wars.

Dahomey

The Dahomey Kingdom was founded in the early 17th century when the Aja people of the Allada kingdom moved northward and settled among the Fon. They began to assert their power a few years later. In so doing they established the Kingdom of Dahomey, with its capital at Agbome. King Houegbadja ( – 1685) organized Dahomey into a powerful centralized state. He declared all lands to be owned of the king and subject to taxation. Primogeniture in the kingship was established, neutralizing all input from village chiefs. A "cult of kingship" was established. A captive slave would be sacrificed annually to honor the royal ancestors. During the 1720s, the slave-trading states of Whydah and Allada were taken, giving Dahomey direct access to the slave coast and trade with Europeans. King Agadja (1708–1740) attempted to end the slave trade by keeping the slaves on plantations producing palm oil, but the European profits on slaves and Dahomey's dependency on firearms were too great. In 1730, under king Agaja, Dahomey was conquered by the Oyo Empire, and Dahomey had to pay tribute. Taxes on slaves were mostly paid in cowrie shells. During the 19th century, palm oil was the main trading commodity. France conquered Dahomey during the Second Franco-Dahomean War (1892–1894) and established a colonial government there. Most of the troops who fought against Dahomey were native Africans.

Yoruba

Traditionally, the Yoruba people viewed themselves as the inhabitants of a united empire, in contrast to the situation today, in which "Yoruba" is the cultural-linguistic designation for speakers of a language in the Niger–Congo family. The name comes from a Hausa word to refer to the Oyo Empire. The first Yoruba state was Ile-Ife, said to have been founded around 1000 AD by a supernatural figure, the first oni Oduduwa. Oduduwa's sons would be the founders of the different city-states of the Yoruba, and his daughters would become the mothers of the various Yoruba obas, or kings. Yoruba city-states were usually governed by an oba and an iwarefa, a council of chiefs who advised the oba. by the 18th century, the Yoruba city-states formed a loose confederation, with the Oni of Ife as the head and Ife as the capital. As time went on, the individual city-states became more powerful with their obas assuming more powerful spiritual positions and diluting the authority of the Oni of Ife. Rivalry became intense among the city-states.

The Oyo Empire rose in the 16th century. The Oyo state had been conquered in 1550 by the kingdom of Nupe, which was in possession of cavalry, an important tactical advantage. The alafin (king) of Oyo was sent into exile. After returning, Alafin Orompoto ( – 1580) built up an army based on heavily armed cavalry and long-service troops. This made them invincible in combat on the northern grasslands and in the thinly wooded forests. By the end of the 16th century, Oyo had added the western region of the Niger to the hills of Togo, the Yoruba of Ketu, Dahomey, and the Fon nation.

A governing council served the empire, with clear executive divisions. Each acquired region was assigned a local administrator. Families served in king-making capacities. Oyo, as a northern Yoruba kingdom, served as middle-man in the north–south trade and connecting the eastern forest of Guinea with the western and central Sudan, the Sahara, and North Africa. The Yoruba manufactured cloth, ironware, and pottery, which were exchanged for salt, leather, and most importantly horses from the Sudan to maintain the cavalry. Oyo remained strong for two hundred years. It became a protectorate of Great Britain in 1888, before further fragmenting into warring factions. The Oyo state ceased to exist as any sort of power in 1896.

Benin

The Kwa Niger–Congo speaking Edo people had established the Benin Empire by the middle of the 15th century. It was engaged in political expansion and consolidation from its very beginning. Under Oba (king) Ewuare ( – 1480 AD), the state was organized for conquest. He solidified central authority and initiated 30 years of war with his neighbors. At his death, the Benin Empire extended to Dahomey in the west, to the Niger Delta in the east, along the west African coast, and to the Yoruba towns in the north.

Ewuare's grandson Oba Esigie (1504–1550) eroded the power of the uzama (state council) and increased contact and trade with Europeans, especially with the Portuguese who provided a new source of copper for court art.
The oba ruled with the advice of the uzama, a council consisting of chiefs of powerful families and town chiefs of different guilds. Later its authority was diminished by the establishment of administrative dignitaries. Women wielded power. The queen mother who produced the future oba wielded immense influence.

Benin was never a significant exporter of slaves, as Alan Ryder's book Benin and the Europeans showed. By the early 18th century, it was wrecked with dynastic disputes and civil wars. However, it regained much of its former power in the reigns of Oba Eresoyen and Oba Akengbuda. After the 16th century, Benin mainly exported pepper, ivory, gum, and cotton cloth to the Portuguese and Dutch who resold it to other African societies on the coast. In 1897, the British sacked the city.

Niger Delta and Igbo

The Niger Delta comprised numerous city-states with numerous forms of government. These city-states were protected by the waterways and thick vegetation of the delta. The region was transformed by trade in the 17th century. The delta's city-states were comparable to those of the Swahili people in East Africa. Some, like Bonny, Kalabari, and Warri, had kings. Others, like Brass, were republics with small senates, and those at Cross River and Old Calabar were ruled by merchants of the ekpe society. The ekpe society regulated trade and made rules for members known as house systems. Some of these houses, like the Pepples of Bonny, were well known in the Americas and Europe.

The Igbo lived east of the delta (but with the Anioma on the west of the Niger River). The Kingdom of Nri rose in the 9th century, with the Eze Nri being its leader. It was a political entity composed of villages, and each village was autonomous and independent with its own territory and name, each recognized by its neighbors. Villages were democratic with all males and sometimes females a part of the decision-making process. Graves at Igbo-Ukwu (800 AD) contained brass artifacts of local manufacture and glass beads from Egypt or India, indicative of extraregional trade.

19th century

Southern Africa

By the 1850s, British and German missionaries and traders had penetrated present-day Namibia. The Herero and Nama peoples competed for guns and ammunition, providing cattle, ivory, and ostrich feathers. The Germans were more firmly established than the British in the region. By 1884, the Germans declared the coastal region from the Orange River to the Kunene River a German protectorate, part of German South West Africa. They pursued an aggressive policy of land expansion for white settlements. They exploited rivalry between the Nama and Herero.

The Herero entered into an alliance with the Germans, thinking they could get an upper hand on the Nama. The Germans set up a garrison at the Herero capital and started allocating Herero land for white settlements, including the best grazing land in the central plateau, and made tax and labor demands. The Herero and Ovambanderu rebelled, but the rebellion was crushed and leaders were executed. Between 1896 and 1897, rinderpest impaired the Herero and Nama economy and slowed white expansion. The Germans continued the policy of making Namibia a white settlement by seizing land and cattle, and even trying to export Herero labor to South Africa.

In 1904, the Herero rebelled again. German General Lothar von Trotha implemented an extermination policy at the Battle of Waterberg, which drove the Herero west of the Kalahari Desert. At the end of 1905, only 16,000 Herero were alive, out of a previous population of 80,000. Nama resistance was crushed in 1907. All Nama and Herero cattle and land were confiscated from the very diminished population, with remaining Nama and Herero assuming a subordinate position. Labor had to be imported from among the Ovambo.

Nguniland

A moment of great disorder in southern Africa was the Mfecane, "the crushing." It was started by the northern Nguni kingdoms of Mthethwa, Ndwandwe, and Swaziland over scarce resource and famine. When Dingiswayo of Mthethwa died, Shaka of the Zulu people took over. He established the Zulu Kingdom, asserting authority over the Ndwandwe and pushing the Swazi north. The scattering Ndwandwe and Swazi caused the Mfecane to spread. During the 1820s, Shaka expanded the empire all along the Drakensberg foothills, with tribute being paid as far south as the Tugela and Umzimkulu rivers. He replaced the chiefs of conquered polities with indunas, responsible to him. He introduced a centralized, dedicated, and disciplined military force not seen in the region, with a new weapon in the short stabbing-spear.

In 1828, Shaka was assassinated by his half brother Dingane, who lacked the military genius and leadership skills of Shaka. Voortrekkers tried to occupy Zulu land in 1838. In the early months they were defeated, but the survivors regrouped at the Ncome River and soundly defeated the Zulu. However, the Voortrekkers dared not settle Zulu land. Dingane was killed in 1840 during a civil war. His brother Mpande took over and strengthened Zulu territories to the north. In 1879 the Zulu Kingdom was invaded by Britain in a quest to control all of South Africa. The Zulu Kingdom was victorious at the Battle of Isandlwana but was defeated at the Battle of Ulundi.

One of the major states to emerge from the Mfecane was the Sotho Kingdom founded at Thaba Bosiu by Moshoeshoe I around 1821 to 1822. It was a confederation of different polities that accepted the absolute authority of Moshoeshoe. During the 1830s, the kingdom invited missionaries as a strategic means of acquiring guns and horses from the Cape. The Orange Free State slowly diminished the kingdom but never completely defeated it. In 1868, Moshoeshoe asked that the Sotho Kingdom be annexed by Britain, to save the remnant. It became the British protectorate of Basutoland.

Sotho-Tswana

The arrival of the ancestors of the Tswana-speakers who came to control the region (from the Vaal River to Botswana) has yet to be dated precisely although AD 600 seems to be a consensus estimate. This massive cattle-raising complex prospered until 1300 AD or so. All these various peoples were connected to trade routes that ran via the Limpopo River to the Indian Ocean, and trade goods from Asia such as beads made their way to Botswana most likely in exchange for ivory, gold, and rhinoceros horn. The first written records relating to modern-day Botswana appear in 1824. What these records show is that the Bangwaketse had become the predominant power in the region. Under the rule of Makaba II, the Bangwaketse kept vast herds of cattle in well-protected desert areas, and used their military prowess to raid their neighbours. Other chiefdoms in the area, by this time, had capitals of 10,000 or so and were fairly prosperous. This equilibrium came to end during the Mfecane period, 1823–1843, when a succession of invading peoples from South Africa entered the country. Although the Bangwaketse were able to defeat the invading Bakololo in 1826, over time all the major chiefdoms in Botswana were attacked, weakened, and impoverished. The Bakololo and Amandebele raided repeatedly, and took large numbers of cattle, women, and children from the Batswana—most of whom were driven into the desert or sanctuary areas such as hilltops and caves. Only after 1843, when the Amandebele moved into western Zimbabwe, did this threat subside. During the 1840s and 1850s trade with Cape Colony-based merchants opened up and enabled the Batswana chiefdoms to rebuild. The Bakwena, Bangwaketse, Bangwato and Batawana cooperated to control the lucrative ivory trade, and then used the proceeds to import horses and guns, which in turn enabled them to establish control over what is now Botswana. This process was largely complete by 1880, and thus the Bushmen, the Bakalanga, the Bakgalagadi, the Batswapong and other current minorities were subjugated by the Batswana. Following the Great Trek, Afrikaners from the Cape Colony established themselves on the borders of Botswana in the Transvaal. In 1852 a coalition of Tswana chiefdoms led by Sechele I resisted Afrikaner incursions, and after about eight years of intermittent tensions and hostilities, eventually came to a peace agreement in Potchefstroom in 1860. From that point on, the modern-day border between South Africa and Botswana was agreed on, and the Afrikaners and Batswana traded and worked together peacefully. In the 1820s, refugees from the Zulu expansion under Shaka came into contact with the Basotho people residing on the highveld. In 1823, those pressures caused one group of Basotho, the Kololo, to migrate north, past the Okavango Swamp and across the Zambezi into Barotseland, now part of Zambia. In 1845, the Kololo conquered Barotseland.

At about the same time, the Boers began to encroach upon Basotho territory. After the Cape Colony had been ceded to Britain at the conclusion of the Napoleonic Wars, the voortrekkers ("pioneers") were farmers who opted to leave the former Dutch colony and moved inland where they eventually established independent polities.

At the time of these developments, Moshoeshoe I gained control of the Basotho kingdoms of the southern Highveld. Universally praised as a skilled diplomat and strategist, he was able to wield the disparate refugee groups escaping the Difaqane into a cohesive nation. His inspired leadership helped his small nation to survive the dangers and pitfalls (the Zulu hegemony, the inward expansion of the voortrekkers and the designs of imperial Britain) that destroyed other indigenous South African kingdoms during the 19th century.

In 1822, Moshoeshoe established his capital at Butha-Buthe, an easily defensible mountain in the northern Drakensberg mountains, laying the foundations of the eventual Kingdom of Lesotho. His capital was later moved to Thaba Bosiu.

To deal with the encroaching voortrekker groups, Moshoeshoe encouraged French missionary activity in his kingdom. Missionaries sent by the Paris Evangelical Missionary Society provided the King with foreign affairs counsel and helped to facilitate the purchase of modern weapons.

Aside from acting as state ministers, missionaries (primarily Casalis and Arbousset) played a vital role in delineating Sesotho orthography and printing Sesotho language materials between 1837 and 1855. The first Sesotho translation of the Bible appeared in 1878.

In 1868, after losing the western lowlands to the Boers during the Free State–Basotho Wars; Moshoeshoe successfully appealed to Queen Victoria to proclaim Lesotho (then known as Basutoland) a protectorate of Britain and the British administration was placed in Maseru, the site of Lesotho's current capital. Local chieftains retained power over internal affairs while Britain was responsible for foreign affairs and the defence of the protectorate. In 1869, the British sponsored a process by which the borders of Basutoland were finally demarcated. While many clans had territory within Basutoland, large numbers of Sesotho speakers resided in areas allocated to the Orange Free State, the sovereign voortrekker republic that bordered the Basotho kingdom.

Voortrekkers

By the 19th century, most Khoikhoi territory was under Boer control. The Khoikhoi had lost economic and political independence and had been absorbed into Boer society. The Boers spoke Afrikaans, a language or dialect derived from Dutch, and no longer called themselves Boers but Afrikaners. Some Khoikhoi were used as commandos in raids against other Khoikhoi and later Xhosa. A mixed Khoi, slave, and European population called the Cape Coloureds, who were outcasts within colonial society, also arose. Khoikhoi who lived far on the frontier included the Kora, Oorlams, and Griqua. In 1795, the British took over the cape colony from the Dutch.

In the 1830s, Boers embarked on a journey of expansion, east of the Great Fish River into the Zuurveld. They were referred to as Voortrekkers. They founded republics of the Transvaal and Orange Free State, mostly in areas of sparse population that had been diminished by the Mfecane/Difaqane. Unlike the Khoisan, the Bantu states were not conquered by the Afrikaners, because of population density and greater unity. Additionally, they began to arm themselves with guns acquired through trade at the cape. In some cases, as in the Xhosa/Boer Wars, Boers were removed from Xhosa lands. It required a dedicated imperial military force to subdue the Bantu-speaking states. In 1901, the Boer republics were defeated by Britain in the Second Boer War. The defeat however consummated many Afrikaners' ambition: South Africa would be under white rule. The British placed all power—legislative, executive, administrative—in English and Afrikaner hands.

European trade, exploration and conquest

Between 1878 and 1898, European states partitioned and conquered most of Africa. For 400 years, European nations had mainly limited their involvement to trading stations on the African coast. Few dared venture inland from the coast; those that did, like the Portuguese, often met defeats and had to retreat to the coast. Several technological innovations helped to overcome this 400-year pattern. One was the development of repeating rifles, which were easier and quicker to load than muskets. Artillery was being used increasingly. In 1885, Hiram S. Maxim developed the maxim gun, the model of the modern-day machine gun. European states kept these weapons largely among themselves by refusing to sell these weapons to African leaders.

African germs took numerous European lives and deterred permanent settlements. Diseases such as yellow fever, sleeping sickness, yaws, and leprosy made Africa a very inhospitable place for Europeans. The deadliest disease was malaria, endemic throughout Tropical Africa. In 1854, the discovery of quinine and other medical innovations helped to make conquest and colonization in Africa possible.

Strong motives for conquest of Africa were at play. Raw materials were needed for European factories. Europe in the early part of the 19th century was undergoing its Industrial Revolution. Nationalist rivalries and prestige were at play. Acquiring African colonies would show rivals that a nation was powerful and significant. These factors culminated in the Scramble for Africa.

Knowledge of Africa increased. Numerous European explorers began to explore the continent. Mungo Park traversed the Niger River. James Bruce travelled through Ethiopia and located the source of the Blue Nile. Richard Francis Burton was the first European at Lake Tanganyika. Samuel White Baker explored the Upper Nile. John Hanning Speke located a source of the Nile at Lake Victoria. Other significant European explorers included Heinrich Barth, Henry Morton Stanley (coiner of the term "Dark Continent" for Africa in an 1878 book), Silva Porto, Alexandre de Serpa Pinto, Rene Caille, Friedrich Gerhard Rohlfs, Gustav Nachtigal, George Schweinfurth, and Joseph Thomson. The most famous of the explorers was David Livingstone, who explored southern Africa and traversed the continent from the Atlantic at Luanda to the Indian Ocean at Quelimane. European explorers made use of African guides and servants, and established long-distance trading routes.

Missionaries attempting to spread Christianity also increased European knowledge of Africa. Between 1884 and 1885, European nations met at the Berlin West Africa Conference to discuss the partitioning of Africa. It was agreed that European claims to parts of Africa would only be recognised if Europeans provided effective occupation. In a series of treaties in 1890–1891, colonial boundaries were completely drawn. All of Sub-Saharan Africa was claimed by European powers, except for Ethiopia (Abyssinia) and Liberia.

The European powers set up a variety of different administrations in Africa, reflecting different ambitions and degrees of power. In some areas, such as parts of British West Africa, colonial control was tenuous and intended for simple economic extraction, strategic power, or as part of a long-term development plan. In other areas, Europeans were encouraged to settle, creating settler states in which a European minority dominated. Settlers only came to a few colonies in sufficient numbers to have a strong impact. British settler colonies included British East Africa (now Kenya), Northern and Southern Rhodesia, (Zambia and Zimbabwe, respectively), and South Africa, which already had a significant population of European settlers, the Boers. France planned to settle Algeria and eventually incorporate it into the French state on an equal basis with the European provinces. Algeria's proximity across the Mediterranean allowed plans of this scale.

In most areas colonial administrations did not have the manpower or resources to fully administer the territory and had to rely on local power structures to help them. Various factions and groups within the societies exploited this European requirement for their own purposes, attempting to gain positions of power within their own communities by cooperating with Europeans. One aspect of this struggle included what Terence Ranger has termed the "invention of tradition." In order to legitimize their own claims to power in the eyes of both the colonial administrators and their own people, native elites would essentially manufacture "traditional" claims to power, or ceremonies. As a result, many societies were thrown into disarray by the new order.

Following the Scramble for Africa, an early but secondary focus for most colonial regimes was the suppression of slavery and the slave trade. By the end of the colonial period they were mostly successful in this aim, though slavery is still very active in Africa.

France versus Britain: the Fashoda crisis of 1898

As a part of the Scramble for Africa, France had the establishment of a continuous west–east axis of the continent as an objective, in contrast with the British north–south axis. Tensions between Britain and France reached tinder stage in Africa. At several points war was possible, but never happened. The most serious episode was the Fashoda Incident of 1898. French troops tried to claim an area in the Southern Sudan, and a much more powerful British force purporting to be acting in the interests of the Khedive of Egypt arrived to confront them. Under heavy pressure the French withdrew securing British control over the area. The status quo was recognised by an agreement between the two states acknowledging British control over Egypt, while France became the dominant power in Morocco, but France suffered a humiliating defeat overall.

European colonial territories

Belgium
 Congo Free State and Belgian Congo (today's Democratic Republic of the Congo)
 Ruanda-Urundi (comprising modern Rwanda and Burundi, between 1916 and 1960)

France

 French West Africa:
 Mauritania
 Senegal
 French Sudan (now Mali)
 French Guinea (now Guinea)
 Ivory Coast
 Niger
 French Upper Volta (now Burkina Faso)
 French Dahomey (now Benin)
 French Algeria (now Algeria)
 Tunisia
 French Morocco
 French Somaliland (now Djibouti)
 Madagascar
 Comoros
 French Equatorial Africa:
 Gabon
 Middle Congo (now the Republic of the Congo)
 Oubangi-Chari (now the Central African Republic)
 Chad

Germany
 German Kamerun (now Cameroon and part of Nigeria)
 German East Africa (now Rwanda, Burundi and most of Tanzania)
 German South West Africa (now Namibia)
 German Togoland (now Togo and eastern part of Ghana)

Italy
 Italian North Africa (now Libya)
 Eritrea
 Italian Somaliland (now part of Somalia)

Portugal

 Portuguese West Africa (now Angola)
 Mainland Angola
 Portuguese Congo (now Cabinda Province of Angola)
 Portuguese East Africa (now Mozambique)
 Portuguese Guinea (now Guinea-Bissau)
 Cape Verde Islands
 São Tomé e Príncipe
 São Tomé Island
 Príncipe Island
 Fort of São João Baptista de Ajudá (now Ouidah, in Benin)

Spain

 Spanish Sahara (now Western Sahara)
 Río de Oro
 Saguia el-Hamra
 Spanish Morocco
 Tarfaya Strip
 Ifni
 Spanish Guinea (now Equatorial Guinea)
 Fernando Po
 Río Muni
 Annobón

United Kingdom

 Egypt
 Anglo-Egyptian Sudan (now Sudan)
 British Somaliland (now part of Somalia)
 British East Africa:
 Kenya
 Uganda Protectorate (now Uganda)
 Tanganyika (1919–1961, now part of Tanzania)
 Zanzibar (now part of Tanzania)
 Bechuanaland (now Botswana)
 Southern Rhodesia (now Zimbabwe)
 Northern Rhodesia (now Zambia)
 British South Africa (now South Africa)
 Transvaal (now part of South Africa)
 Cape Colony (now part of South Africa)
 Colony of Natal (now part of South Africa)
 Orange Free State (now part of South Africa)
 The Gambia
 Sierra Leone
 Nigeria
 Cameroons (now parts of Cameroon and Nigeria)
 British Gold Coast (now Ghana)
 Nyasaland (now Malawi)
 Basutoland (now Lesotho)
 Swaziland

Independent states
 Liberia, founded by the American Colonization Society of the United States in 1821; declared independence in 1847
 Ethiopian Empire (Abyssinia) had its borders re-drawn with Italian Eritrea and French Somaliland (modern Djibouti), briefly occupied by Italy from 1936 to 1941 during the Abyssinia Crisis;
 Sudan, independent under Mahdi rule between 1885 and 1899. It was then under British rule from 1899 to 1956.

20th century

In the 1880s the European powers had divided up almost all of Africa (only Ethiopia and Liberia were independent). They ruled until after World War II when forces of nationalism grew much stronger. In the 1950s and 1960s the colonial holdings became independent states. The process was usually peaceful but there were several long bitter bloody civil wars, as in Algeria, Kenya and elsewhere. Across Africa the powerful new force of nationalism drew upon the organizational skills that natives learned in the British and French and other armies in the world wars. It led to organizations that were not controlled by or endorsed by either the colonial powers not the traditional local power structures that were collaborating with the colonial powers. Nationalistic organizations began to challenge both the traditional and the new colonial structures and finally displaced them. Leaders of nationalist movements took control when the European authorities exited; many ruled for decades or until they died off. These structures included political, educational, religious, and other social organizations. In recent decades, many African countries have undergone the triumph and defeat of nationalistic fervor, changing in the process the loci of the centralizing state power and patrimonial state.

World War I

With the vast majority of the continent under the colonial control of European governments, the World Wars were significant events in the geopolitical history of Africa. Africa was a theater of war and saw fighting in both wars. More important in most regions, the total war footing of colonial powers impacted the governance of African colonies, through resource allocation, conscription, and taxation. In World War I there were several campaigns in Africa, including the Togoland Campaign, the Kamerun campaign, the South West Africa campaign, and the East African campaign. In each, Allied forces, primarily British, but also French, Belgian, South African, and Portuguese, sought to force the Germans out of their African colonies. In each, German forces were badly outnumbered and, due to Allied naval superiority, were cut off from reinforcement or resupply. The Allies eventually conquered all German colonies; German forces in East Africa managed to avoid surrender throughout the war, though they could not hold any territory after 1917. After World War I, former German colonies in Africa were taken over by France, Belgium, and the British Empire.

After World War I, colonial powers continued to consolidate their control over their African territories. In some areas, particularly in Southern and East Africa, large settler populations were successful in pressing for additional devolution of administration, so-called "home rule" by the white settlers. In many cases, settler regimes were harsher on African populations, tending to see them more as a threat to political power, as opposed to colonial regimes which had generally endeavored to co-opt local populations into economic production. The Great Depression strongly affected Africa's non-subsistence economy, much of which was based on commodity production for Western markets. As demand increased in the late 1930s, Africa's economy rebounded as well.

Africa was the site of one of the first instances of fascist territorial expansions in the 1930s. Italy had attempted to conquer Ethiopia in the 1890s but had been rebuffed in the First Italo-Ethiopian War. Ethiopia lay between two Italian colonies, Italian Somaliland and Eritrea and was invaded in October 1935. With an overwhelming advantage in armor and aircraft, by May 1936, Italian forces had occupied the capital of Addis Ababa and effectively declared victory. Ethiopia and their other colonies were consolidated into Italian East Africa.

World War II: Political

Africa was a large continent whose geography gave it strategic importance during the war. North Africa was the scene of major British and American campaigns against Italy and Germany; East Africa was the scene of a major British campaign against Italy. The vast geography provided major transportation routes linking the United States to the Middle East and Mediterranean regions. The sea route around South Africa was heavily used even though it added 40 days to voyages that had to avoid the dangerous Suez region. Lend Lease supplies to Russia often came this way. Internally, long-distance road and railroad connections facilitated the British war effort. The Union of South Africa had dominion status and was largely self-governing, the other British possessions were ruled by the colonial office, usually with close ties to local chiefs and kings. Italian holdings were the target of successful British military campaigns. The Belgian Congo, and two other Belgian colonies, were major exporters. In terms of numbers and wealth, the British controlled the richest portions of Africa, and made extensive use not only of the geography, but the manpower, and the natural resources. Civilian colonial officials made a special effort to upgrade the African infrastructure, promote agriculture, integrate colonial Africa with the world economy, and recruit over a half million soldiers.

Before the war, Britain had made few plans for the utilization of Africa, but it quickly set up command structures. The Army set up the West Africa Command, which recruited 200,000 soldiers. The East Africa Command was created in September 1941 to support the overstretched Middle East Command. It provided the largest number of men, over 320,000, chiefly from Kenya, Tanganyika, and Uganda. The Southern Command was the domain of South Africa. The Royal Navy set up the South Atlantic Command based in Sierra Leone, that became one of the main convoy assembly points. The RAF Coastal Command had major submarine-hunting operations based in West Africa, while a smaller RAF command dealt with submarines in the Indian Ocean. Ferrying aircraft from North America and Britain was the major mission of the Western Desert Air Force. In addition smaller more localized commands were set up throughout the war.

Before 1939, the military establishments were very small throughout British Africa, and largely consisted of whites, who comprised under two percent of the population outside South Africa. As soon as the war began, newly created African units were set up, primarily by the Army. The new recruits were almost always volunteers, usually provided in close cooperation with local tribal leaders. During the war, military pay scales far exceeded what civilians natives could earn, especially when food, housing and clothing allowances are included. The largest numbers were in construction units, called Pioneer units, with over 82,000 soldiers. The RAF and Navy also did some recruiting. The volunteers did some fighting, a great deal of guard duty, and construction work. 80,000 served in the Middle East. A special effort was made not to challenge white supremacy, certainly before the war, and to a large extent during the war itself. Nevertheless, the soldiers were drilled and train to European standards, given strong doses of propaganda, and learn leadership and organizational skills that proved essential to the formation of nationalistic and independence movements after 1945. There were minor episodes of discontent, but nothing serious, among the natives. Afrikaner nationalism was a factor in South Africa, But the pro-German Afrikaner prime minister was replaced in 1939 by Jan Smuts, an Afrikaner who was an enthusiastic supporter of the British Empire. His government closely cooperated with London and raised 340,000 volunteers (190,000 were white, or about one-third of the eligible white men).

French Africa

As early as 1857, the French established volunteer units of black soldiers in sub- Sahara Africa, termed the tirailleurs senegalais. They served in military operations throughout the Empire, including 171,000 soldiers in World War I and 160,000 in World War II. About 90,000 became POWs in Germany. The veterans played a central role in the postwar independence movement in French Africa.

Authorities in West Africa declared allegiance to the Vichy regime, as did the colony of French Gabon Vichy forces defeated a Free French Forces invasion of French West Africa in the two battles of Dakar in July and September 1940. Gabon fell to Free France after the Battle of Gabon in November 1940, but West Africa remained under Vichy control until November 1942. Vichy forces tried to resist the overwhelming Allied landings in North Africa (operation Torch) in November 1942. Vichy Admiral François Darlan suddenly switched sides and the fighting ended. The Allies gave Darlan control of North African French forces in exchange for support from both French North Africa as well as French West Africa. Vichy was now eliminated as a factor in Africa. Darlan was assassinated in December, and the two factions of Free French, led by Charles de Gaulle and Henri Giraud, jockeyed for power. De Gaulle finally won out.

World War II: Military

Since Germany had lost its African colonies following World War I, World War II did not reach Africa until Italy joined the war on June 10, 1940, controlling Libya and Italian East Africa. With the fall of France on June 25, most of France's colonies in North and West Africa were controlled by the Vichy government, though much of Central Africa fell under Free French control after some fighting between Vichy and Free French forces at the Battle of Dakar and the Battle of Gabon. After the fall of France, Africa was the only active theater for ground combat until the Italian invasion of Greece in October. In the Western Desert campaign Italian forces from Libya sought to overrun Egypt, controlled by the British. Simultaneously, in the East African campaign, Italian East African forces overran British Somaliland and some British outposts in Kenya and Anglo-Egyptian Sudan. When Italy's efforts to conquer Egypt (including the crucial Suez Canal) and Sudan fell short, they were unable to reestablish supply to Italian East Africa. Without the ability to reinforce or resupply and surrounded by Allied possessions, Italian East Africa was conquered by mainly British and South African forces in 1941. In North Africa, the Italians soon requested help from the Germans who sent a substantial force under General Rommel. With German help, the Axis forces regained the upper hand but were unable to break through British defenses in two tries at El Alamein. In late 1942, Allied forces, mainly Americans and Canadians, invaded French North Africa in Operation Torch, where Vichy French forces initially surprised them with their resistance but were convinced to stop fighting after three days. The second front relieved pressure on the British in Egypt who began pushing west to meet up with the Torch forces, eventually pinning German and Italian forces in Tunisia, which was conquered by May 1943 in the Tunisia campaign, ending the war in Africa. The only other significant operations occurred in the French colony of Madagascar, which was invaded by the British in May 1942 to deny its ports to the Axis (potentially the Japanese who had reached the eastern Indian Ocean). The French garrisons in Madagascar surrendered in November 1942.

Post-war Africa: decolonization

The decolonization of Africa started with Libya in 1951, although Liberia, South Africa, Egypt and Ethiopia were already independent. Many countries followed in the 1950s and 1960s, with a peak in 1960 with the Year of Africa, which saw 17 African nations declare independence, including a large part of French West Africa. Most of the remaining countries gained independence throughout the 1960s, although some colonizers (Portugal in particular) were reluctant to relinquish sovereignty, resulting in bitter wars of independence which lasted for a decade or more. The last African countries to gain formal independence were Guinea-Bissau (1974), Mozambique (1975) and Angola (1975) from Portugal; Djibouti from France in 1977; Zimbabwe from the United Kingdom in 1980; and Namibia from South Africa in 1990. Eritrea later split off from Ethiopia in 1993.

East Africa

The Mau Mau Uprising took place in Kenya from 1952 until 1956 but was put down by British and local forces. A state of emergency remained in place until 1960. Kenya became independent in 1963, and Jomo Kenyatta served as its first president.

The early 1960s also signaled the start of major clashes between the Hutus and the Tutsis in Rwanda and Burundi. In 1994 this culminated in the Rwandan genocide, a conflict in which over 800,000 people were murdered.

North Africa

Moroccan nationalism developed during the 1930s; the Istiqlal Party was formed, pushing for independence. In 1953 sultan Mohammed V of Morocco called for independence. On March 2, 1956, Morocco became independent of France. Mohammed V became ruler of independent Morocco.

In 1954, Algeria formed the National Liberation Front (FLN) as it split from France. This resulted in the Algerian War, which lasted until independence negotiations in 1962. Muhammad Ahmed Ben Bella was elected President of Algeria. Over a million French nationals, predominantly Pied-Noirs, left the country, crippling the economy.

In 1934, the "Neo Destour" (New Constitution) party was founded by Habib Bourguiba pushing for independence in Tunisia. Tunisia became independent in 1955. Its bey was deposed and Habib Bourguiba elected as President of Tunisia.

In 1954, Gamal Abdel Nasser deposed the monarchy of Egypt in the Egyptian Revolution of 1952 and came to power as Prime Minister of Egypt. Muammar Gaddafi led the 1969 Libyan coup d'état which deposed Idris of Libya. Gaddafi remained in power until his death in the Libyan Civil War of 2011.

Egypt was involved in several wars against Israel and was allied with other Arab countries. The first was the 1948 Arab–Israeli War, right after the state of Israel was founded. Egypt went to war again in the Six-Day War of 1967 and lost the Sinai Peninsula to Israel. They went to war yet again in the Yom Kippur War of 1973. In 1979, President of Egypt Anwar Sadat and Prime Minister of Israel Menachem Begin signed the Camp David Accords, which gave back the Sinai Peninsula to Egypt in exchange for the recognition of Israel. The accords are still in effect today. In 1981, Sadat was assassinated by members of the Egyptian Islamic Jihad under Khalid Islambouli. The assassins were Islamists who targeted Sadat for his signing of the Accords.

Southern Africa

In 1948 the apartheid laws were started in South Africa by the dominant National Party. These were largely a continuation of existing policies; the difference was the policy of "separate development" (Apartheid). Where previous policies had only been disparate efforts to economically exploit the African majority, Apartheid represented an entire philosophy of separate racial goals, leading to both the divisive laws of 'petty apartheid,' and the grander scheme of African homelands.

In 1994, Apartheid ended, and Nelson Mandela of the African National Congress was elected president after the South African general election, 1994, the country's first non-racial election.

Central Africa

The central regions of Africa were traditionally regarded to be the regions between Kilwa and the mouth of the Zambesi river. Due to its isolated position from the coasts, this area has received minimal attention from historian pertaining to Africa. It also had one of the most varied sources of European colonial imperialists including Germany in Cameroon, Britain in Northern Cameroons, Belgium in Congo, and France in CAF. Due to its territory, among the main trope s regarding Central Africa is traversing its lands and the nature of its tropicals. Since 1982, one of the main protracted issues within central Africa has been the ongoing secession movement of the secessionist entity of Ambazonia. The impasse between Cameroon and Ambazonia gained steam in 1992 when Fon Gorji-Dinka filed an international lawsuit against Cameroon claiming that Ambazonian territories are held illegally by the latter and describing Cameroonian claims on Ambazonian territories as illegal. Fifteen years later, this stalemate would escalate when Abmazonia formally declared itself as the Federal Republic of Ambazonia.

West Africa

Following World War II, nationalist movements arose across West Africa, most notably in Ghana under Kwame Nkrumah. In 1957, Ghana became the first sub-Saharan colony to achieve its independence, followed the next year by France's colonies; by 1974, West Africa's nations were entirely autonomous. Since independence, many West African nations have been plagued by corruption and instability, with notable civil wars in Nigeria, Sierra Leone, Liberia, and Ivory Coast, and a succession of military coups in Ghana and Burkina Faso. Many states have failed to develop their economies despite enviable natural resources, and political instability is often accompanied by undemocratic government.

History of African Architecture

History of science and technology in Africa

Economic history of Africa

Military history of Africa

Genetic history of Africa

Historiography

Historiography of British Africa

The first historical studies in English appeared in the 1890s, and followed one of four approaches. 1) The territorial narrative was typically written by a veteran soldier or civil servant who gave heavy emphasis to what he had seen. 2) The "apologia" were essays designed to justify British policies. 3) Popularizers tried to reach a large audience. 4) Compendia appeared designed to combine academic and official credentials. Professional scholarship appeared around 1900, and began with the study of business operations, typically using government documents and unpublished archives.

The economic approach was widely practiced in the 1930s, primarily to provide descriptions of the changes underway in the previous half-century. In 1935, American historian William L. Langer published The Diplomacy of Imperialism: 1890–1902, a book that is still widely cited. In 1939, Oxford professor Reginald Coupland published The Exploitation of East Africa, 1856–1890: The Slave Trade and the Scramble, another popular treatment.

World War II diverted most scholars to wartime projects and accounted for a pause in scholarship during the 1940s.

By the 1950s many African students were studying in British universities, and they produced a demand for new scholarship, and started themselves to supply it as well. Oxford University became the main center for African studies, with activity as well at Cambridge University and the London School of Economics. The perspective of British government policymakers or international business operations slowly gave way to a new interest in the activities of the natives, especially nationalistic movements and the growing demand for independence. The major breakthrough came from Ronald Robinson and John Andrew Gallagher, especially with their studies of the impact of free trade on Africa. In 1985 The Oxford History of South Africa (2 vols.) was published, attempting to synthesize the available materials. In 2013, The Oxford Handbook of Modern African History was published, bringing the scholarship up to date.

Historiographic and Conceptual Problems

The current major problem in African studies that Mohamed (2010/2012) identified is the inherited religious, Orientalist, colonial paradigm that European Africanists have preserved in present-day secularist, post-colonial, Anglophone African historiography. African and African-American scholars also bear some responsibility in perpetuating this European Africanist preserved paradigm.

Following conceptualizations of Africa developed by Leo Africanus and Hegel, European Africanists conceptually separated continental Africa into two racialized regions – Sub-Saharan Africa and North Africa. Sub-Saharan Africa, as a racist geographic construction, serves as an objectified, compartmentalized region of "Africa proper", "Africa noire," or "Black Africa." The African diaspora is also considered to be a part of the same racialized construction as Sub-Saharan Africa. North Africa serves as a racialized region of "European Africa", which is conceptually disconnected from Sub-Saharan Africa, and conceptually connected to the Middle East, Asia, and the Islamic world.

As a result of these racialized constructions and the conceptual separation of Africa, darker skinned North Africans, such as the so-called Haratin, who have long resided in the Maghreb, and do not reside south of Saharan Africa, have become analogically alienated from their indigeneity and historic reality in North Africa. While the origin of the term "Haratin" remains speculative, the term may not date much earlier than the 18th century CE and has been involuntarily assigned to darker skinned Maghrebians. Prior to the modern use of the term Haratin as an identifier, and used in contrast to bidan or bayd (white), sumr/asmar, suud/aswad, or Sudan/sudani (black/brown) were Arabic terms used as identifiers for darker skinned Maghrebians before the modern period. "Haratin" is considered to be an offensive term by the darker skinned Maghrebians it is intended to identify; for example, people in the southern region (e.g., Wad Noun, Draa) of Morocco consider it to be an offensive term. Despite its historicity and etymology being questionable, European colonialists and European Africanists have used the term Haratin as identifiers for groups of "black" and apparently "mixed" people found in Algeria, Mauritania, and Morocco.

The Saadian invasion of the Songhai Empire serves as the precursor to later narratives that grouped darker skinned Maghrebians together and identified their origins as being Sub-Saharan West Africa. With gold serving as a motivation behind the Saadian invasion of the Songhai Empire, this made way for changes in latter behaviors toward dark-skinned Africans. As a result of changing behaviors toward dark-skinned Africans, darker skinned Maghrebians were forcibly recruited into the army of Ismail Ibn Sharif as the Black Guard, based on the claim of them having descended from enslaved peoples from the times of the Saadian invasion. Shurafa historians of the modern period would later use these events in narratives about the manumission of enslaved "Hartani" (a vague term, which, by merit of it needing further definition, is implicit evidence for its historicity being questionable). The narratives derived from Shurafa historians would later become analogically incorporated into the Americanized narratives (e.g., the trans-Saharan slave trade, imported enslaved Sub-Saharan West Africans, darker skinned Magrebian freedmen) of the present-day European Africanist paradigm.

As opposed to having been developed through field research, the analogy in the present-day European Africanist paradigm, which conceptually alienates, dehistoricizes, and denaturalizes darker skinned North Africans in North Africa and darker skinned Africans throughout the Islamic world at-large, is primarily rooted in an Americanized textual tradition inherited from 19th century European Christian abolitionists. Consequently, reliable history, as opposed to an antiquated analogy-based history, for darker skinned North Africans and darker skinned Africans in the Islamic world are limited. Part of the textual tradition generally associates an inherited status of servant with dark skin (e.g., Negro labor, Negro cultivators, Negroid slaves, freedman). The European Africanist paradigm uses this as the primary reference point for its construction of origins narratives for darker skinned North Africans (e.g., imported slaves from Sub-Saharan West Africa). With darker skinned North Africans or darker skinned Africans in the Islamic world treated as an allegory of alterity, another part of the textual tradition is the trans-Saharan slave trade and their presence in these regions are treated as that of an African diaspora in North Africa and the Islamic world. Altogether, darker skinned North Africans (e.g., "black" and apparently "mixed" Maghrebians), darker skinned Africans in the Islamic world, the inherited status of servant associated with dark skin, and the trans-Saharan slave trade are conflated and modeled in analogy with African-Americans and the trans-Atlantic slave trade.

The trans-Saharan slave trade has been used as a literary device in narratives that analogically explain the origins of darker skinned North Africans in North Africa and the Islamic world. Caravans have been equated with slave ships, and the amount of forcibly enslaved Africans transported across the Sahara are alleged to be numerically comparable to the considerably large amount of forcibly enslaved Africans transported across the Atlantic Ocean. The simulated narrative of comparable numbers is contradicted by the limited presence of darker skinned North Africans in the present-day Maghreb. As part of this simulated narrative, post-classical Egypt has also been characterized as having plantations. Another part of this simulated narrative is an Orientalist construction of hypersexualized Moors, concubines, and eunuchs. Concubines in harems have been used as an explanatory bridge between the allegation of comparable numbers of forcibly enslaved Africans and the limited amount of present-day darker skinned Maghrebians who have been characterized as their diasporic descendants. Eunuchs were characterized as sentinels who guarded these harems. The simulated narrative is also based on the major assumption that the indigenous peoples of the Maghreb were once purely white Berbers, who then became biracialized through miscegenation with black concubines (existing within a geographic racial binary of pale-skinned Moors residing further north, closer to the Mediterranean region, and dark-skinned Moors residing further south, closer to the Sahara). The religious polemical narrative involving the suffering of enslaved European Christians of the Barbary slave trade has also been adapted to fit the simulated narrative of a comparable number of enslaved Africans being transported by Muslim slaver caravans, from the south of Saharan Africa, into North Africa and the Islamic world.

Despite being an inherited part of the 19th century religious polemical narratives, the use of race in the secularist narrative of the present-day European Africanist paradigm has given the paradigm an appearance of possessing scientific quality. The religious polemical narrative (e.g., holy cause, hostile neologisms) of 19th century European abolitionists about Africa and Africans are silenced, but still preserved, in the secularist narratives of the present-day European Africanist paradigm. The Orientalist stereotyped hypersexuality of the Moors were viewed by 19th century European abolitionists as deriving from the Quran. The reference to times prior, often used in concert with biblical references, by 19th century European abolitionists, may indicate that realities described of Moors may have been literary fabrications. The purpose of these apparent literary fabrications may have been to affirm their view of the Bible as being greater than the Quran and to affirm the viewpoints held by the readers of their composed works. The adoption of 19th century European abolitionists' religious polemical narrative into the present-day European Africanist paradigm may have been due to its correspondence with the established textual tradition. The use of stereotyped hypersexuality for Moors are what 19th century European abolitionists and the present-day European Africanist paradigm have in common.

Due to a lack of considerable development in field research regarding enslavement in Islamic societies, this has resulted in the present-day European Africanist paradigm relying on unreliable estimates for the trans-Saharan slave trade. However, insufficient data has also used as a justification for continued use of the faulty present-day European Africanist paradigm. Darker skinned Maghrebians, particularly in Morocco, have grown weary of the lack of discretion foreign academics have shown toward them, bear resentment toward the way they have been depicted by foreign academics, and consequently, find the intended activities of foreign academics to be predictable. Rather than continuing to rely on the faulty present-day European Africanist paradigm, Mohamed (2012) recommends revising and improving the current Africanist paradigm (e.g., critical inspection of the origins and introduction of the present characterization of the Saharan caravan; reconsideration of what makes the trans-Saharan slave trade, within its own context in Africa, distinct from the trans-Atlantic slave trade; realistic consideration of the experiences of darker-skinned Maghrebians within their own regional context).

Conceptual Problems

Merolla (2017) has indicated that the academic study of Sub-Saharan Africa and North Africa by Europeans developed with North Africa being conceptually subsumed within the Middle East and Arab world, whereas, the study of Sub-Saharan Africa was viewed as conceptually distinct from North Africa, and as its own region, viewed as inherently the same. The common pattern of conceptual separation of continental Africa into two regions and the view of conceptual sameness within the region of Sub-Saharan Africa has continued until present-day. Yet, with increasing exposure of this problem, discussion about the conceptual separation of Africa has begun to develop.

The Sahara has served as a trans-regional zone for peoples in Africa. Authors from various countries (e.g., Algeria, Cameroon, Sudan) in Africa have critiqued the conceptualization of the Sahara as a regional barrier, and provided counter-arguments supporting the interconnectedness of continental Africa; there are historic and cultural connections as well as trade between West Africa, North Africa, and East Africa (e.g., North Africa with Niger and Mali, North Africa with Tanzania and Sudan, major hubs of Islamic learning in Niger and Mali). Africa has been conceptually compartmentalized into meaning "Black Africa", "Africa South of the Sahara", and "Sub-Saharan Africa." North Africa has been conceptually "Orientalized" and separated from Sub-Saharan Africa. While its historic development has occurred within a longer time frame, the epistemic development (e.g., form, content) of the present-day racialized conceptual separation of Africa came as a result of the Berlin Conference and the Scramble for Africa.

In African and Berber literary studies, scholarship has remained largely separate from one another. The conceptual separation of Africa in these studies may be due to how editing policies of studies in the Anglophone and Francophone world are affected by the international politics of the Anglophone and Francophone world. While studies in the Anglophone world have more clearly followed the trend of the conceptual separation of Africa, the Francophone world has been more nuanced, which may stem from imperial policies relating to French colonialism in North Africa and Sub-Saharan Africa. As the study of North Africa has largely been initiated by the Arabophone and Francophone world, denial of the Arabic language having become Africanized throughout the centuries it has been present in Africa has shown that the conceptual separation of Africa remains pervasive in the Francophone world; this denial may stem from historic development of the characterization of an Islamic Arabia existing as a diametric binary to Europe. Among studies in the Francophone world, ties between North Africa and Sub-Saharan Africa have been denied or downplayed, while the ties (e.g., religious, cultural) between the regions and peoples (e.g., Arab language and literature with Berber language and literature) of the Middle East and North Africa have been established by diminishing the differences between the two and selectively focusing on the similarities between the two. In the Francophone world, construction of racialized regions, such as Black Africa (Sub-Saharan Africans) and White Africa (North Africans, e.g., Berbers and Arabs), has also developed.

Despite having invoked and used identities in reference to the racialized conceptualizations of Africa (e.g., North Africa, Sub-Saharan Africa) to oppose imposed identities, Berbers have invoked North African identity to oppose Arabized and Islamicized identities, and Sub-Saharan Africans (e.g., Negritude, Black Consciousness) and the African diaspora (e.g., Black is Beautiful) have invoked and used black identity to oppose colonialism and racism. While Berber studies has largely sought to be establish ties between Berbers and North Africa with Arabs and the Middle East, Merolla (2017) indicated that efforts to establish ties between Berbers and North Africa with Sub-Saharan Africans and Sub-Saharan Africa have recently started to being undertaken.

See also

 Economic history of Africa
 African historiography
 Historians of Africa
 List of history journals#Africa
 List of kingdoms in pre-colonial Africa
 List of sovereign states and dependent territories in Africa
 Outline of Africa#History of Africa
 Africa-Europe relations
 Africa-United States relations
 Africa–China relations
 Soviet Union-Africa relations

References

Bibliography

 
 
 
 
 
 
 

 
 
 
 
 
 
  Looks at the slave trade, the adaptation of Africans to new conditions, their struggle for freedom and equality, and the establishment of a "black" diaspora and its local influence around the world; covers 1430 to 2001.

Further reading

 Byfield, Judith A. et al. eds. Africa and World War II (Cambridge UP, 2015).
 Clark, J. Desmond (1970). The Prehistory of Africa. Thames and Hudson
 Davidson, Basil (1964). The African Past. Penguin, Harmondsworth
 Devermont, Judd. "World Is Coming to Sub-Saharan Africa. Where Is the United States?" (Center for Strategic and International Studies (CSIS), 2018) online.
 Duignan, P., and L. H. Gann. The United States and Africa: A History (Cambridge University Press, 1984)
 Fage, J.D. and Roland Oliver, eds. The Cambridge History of Africa (8 vol 1975–1986)
 Falola, Toyin. Africa, Volumes 1–5.
 FitzSimons, William. "Sizing Up the 'Small Wars' of African Empire: An Assessment of the Context and Legacies of Nineteenth-Century Colonial Warfare". Journal of African Military History 2#1 (2018): 63–78. 
 
 Freund, Bill (1998). The Making of Contemporary Africa, Lynne Rienner, Boulder (including a substantial "Annotated Bibliography" pp. 269–316).
 Herbertson, A. J. and O. J. R. Howarth. eds. The Oxford Survey Of The British Empire (6 vol 1914) on Africa; 550pp; comprehensive coverage of South Africa and British colonies
 July, Robert (1998). A History of the African People, (Waveland Press, 1998).
 Killingray, David, and Richard Rathbone, eds. Africa and the Second World War (Springer, 1986).
 Lamphear, John, ed. African Military History (Routledge, 2007).
 Obenga, Théophile (1980). Pour une Nouvelle Histoire Présence Africaine, Paris
 Reader, John (1997). Africa: A Biography of the Continent. Hamish Hamilton. 
 Roberts, Stephen H. History of French Colonial Policy (1870–1925) (2 vols., 1929) vol 1 online also vol 2 online; comprehensive scholarly history
 Shillington, Kevin (1989). History of Africa, New York: St. Martin's.
 Thornton, John K. Warfare in Atlantic Africa, 1500–1800 (Routledge, 1999).
 UNESCO (1980–1994). General History of Africa . 8 volumes.
 Worden, Nigel (1995). The Making of Modern South Africa, Oxford UK, Cambridge US: Blackwell.

Atlases

 Ajayi, A.J.F. and Michael Crowder. Historical Atlas of Africa (1985); 300 color maps.
 Fage, J.D. Atlas of African History (1978)
 Freeman-Grenville, G.S.P. The New Atlas of African History (1991).
 Kwamena-Poh, Michael, et al. African history in Maps (Longman, 1982).
 McEvedy, Colin. The Penguin Atlas of African History (2nd ed. 1996). excerpt

Historiography

 Boyd, Kelly, ed. Encyclopedia of Historians and Historical Writers (Rutledge, 1999) 1:4–14.
 
 
 Philips, John Edward, ed. Writing African History (2005)

External links
 "Race, Evolution and the Science of Human Origins" by Allison Hopper, Scientific American (5 July 2021).
 Worldtimelines.org.uk – Africa The British Museum. 2005
 The Historyscoper.
 About.com:African History .
 The Story of Africa BBC World Service.
 Wonders of the African World, PBS.
 Civilization of Africa by Richard Hooker, Washington State University.
 African Art Metropolitan Museum of Art.
 African Kingdoms, by Khaleel Muhammad.
 Mapungubwe Museum at the University of Pretoria
 Project Diaspora.
 Kush Communications | Media Production Company London.

History of Africa